= The March (1945) =

Death march during the final months of the Second World War in Europe

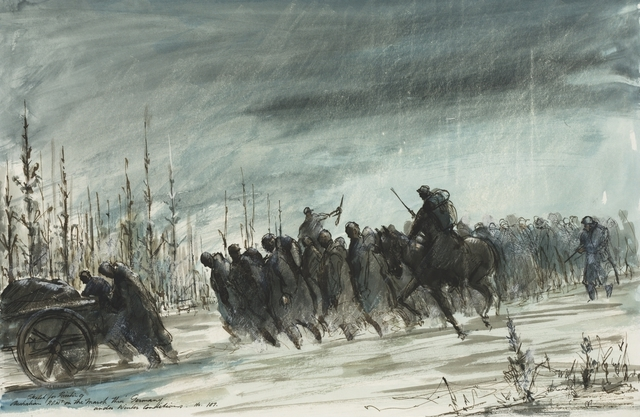
A drawing of Australian POWs being marched through Germany during the winter of 1944-45

"The March" refers to a series of forced marches during the final stages of the Second World War in Europe. From a total of 257,000 western Allied prisoners of war held in German military prison camps, over 80,000 POWs were forced to march westward across Poland, Czechoslovakia, and Germany in extreme winter conditions, over about four months between January and April 1945. This series of events has been called various names: "The Great March West", "The Long March", "The Long Walk", "The Long Trek", "The Black March", "The Bread March", and "Death March Across Germany", but most survivors just called it "The March".

As the Soviet Army was advancing on the Eastern Front, German authorities decided to evacuate POW camps around the area, to delay the liberation of the prisoners. At the same time, hundreds of thousands of German civilian refugees, most of them women and children, as well as civilians of other nationalities, were also making their way on foot westward.

Notorious examples include:

- from Stalag Luft IV at Gross Tychow in Pomerania the prisoners faced an 800 km (500 mi) trek in blizzard conditions across Germany, during which hundreds died, and;
- a march from Stalag VIII-B, known as the "Lamsdorf Death March", which was similar to the better-known Bataan Death March (1942) in terms of mortality rates.
- from Stalag Luft III in Silesia to Bavaria

== Motives ==
On 19 July 1944, Adolf Hitler issued an order from his headquarters, Wolfsschanze, 150 km (93 mi) west of Stalag Luft VI, "concerning preparations for the defence of the Reich". It put the German civilian population on total war footing and issued instructions for preparations for evacuations of "foreign labour" (slave labour) and civilians away from the advancing Soviet Army in the east. Item 6(a) called for "preparations for moving prisoners of war to the rear". This prolonged the war for hundreds of thousands of Allied personnel, as well as causing them severe hardship, starvation, injuries and/or death.

In the later stages of the war there were great concerns among POWs over the motives for moving them westward. Many different and conflicting rumours abounded, including suggestions that:

- They were being moved towards concentration camps to be murdered, in revenge for Allied commanders' deliberate targeting of civilians in cities such as Dresden.
- POWs would be force-marched until their deaths from exhaustion, a practice that had already been made notorious by the Japanese military (see, for instance: Bataan Death March).
- They would be held hostage to leverage peace deals, including claims that they would be held at a national redoubt in the Alps. This claim was backed up by SS General Gottlob Berger, who was appointed general commander of POW camps during 1944. Berger stated during his trial for war crimes (1948), that Hitler had considered a threat to execute 35,000 POWs, unless the Allies agreed to a peace deal. Similarly, SS chief Heinrich Himmler had made similar plans, centred on the Baltic coastal region and set up a new headquarters in a castle on the Bay of Lübeck.

== Main evacuation routes to the west ==
Robert Schirmer was the Red Cross delegate in northern Germany when the evacuation of POW camps was taking place. His situation report was received in London and Washington on 18 February 1945. He is likely to have seen a group of marchers on the road in Pomerania. He had knowledge of the overall POW situation in Germany, and his report described three main POW evacuation routes to the west:

- The "northern route", included POWs from Stalag XX-B, Stalag XX-A and Stalag Luft IV. Many of the men in Stalag Luft VI, the camp closest to the Russian advance, were transported to Stalag XX-A by train in July 1944, and so took part in the evacuation from there. (This is the group that included Dixie Deans.) Schirmer estimated that 100,000 POWs took the northern route. It went to Stalag Luft IV at Gross Tychow, Pomerania then via Stettin to Stalag XI-B and Stalag 357 at Fallingbostel. Some prisoners were marched from here at the end of the war towards Lübeck, however, for most, Fallingbostel was their final destination. The route involved crossing the River Oder and the Elbe. (Note: PoW Charles Waite was in a group which crossed the Oder at Stettin (Szczecin); shortly after this, the bridge was blown up. They crossed the Elbe by walking across the frozen river.) In interpreting Schirmer's description, Nichol and Rennell emphasise that the various groups of POWs were distributed across an area of more than 500 square miles (1,300 km^{2}), with some still far behind on roads to the west of Danzig (Gdansk): so the reality was much less organised than it might first appear.
- A "central route", started at Stalag Luft 7 at Bankau, near Kreuzburg in Silesia (now Poland), via Stalag 344 (formerly and usually known as Stalag VIII-B) at Lamsdorf, to Stalag VIII-A at Görlitz, then ending at Stalag III-A at Luckenwalde, 30 kilometres (19 mi) south of Berlin.
- The "southern route", from Stalag VIII-B (formerly Stalag VIII-D) at Teschen (not far from Auschwitz) which led through Czechoslovakia, towards Stalag XIII-D at Nuremberg and then onto Stalag VII-A at Moosburg in Bavaria.

The direction of travel was not consistent. An individual group would sometimes travel in circles and end up at a previous stopping point; it often zig-zagged. Charles Waite describes his route as: Marienburg (Stalag XX-B), Neustettin, Nuebrandenburg, Schwerin, heading for Lübeck but diverting south to Wittenberge, Stendal (after crossing the frozen Elbe), Magdeburg, Halle (just north of Leipzig), Luckenwalde, Belzig, Brandenburg, eastwards towards Potsdam and then in the direction of Berlin. Waite estimated the distance covered as 1,600 kilometres (990 mi). Comparison of this route with Schirmer's description of the three lines of march may suggest to the reader that his group started on the northern line of march and finished on the central one.

According to Nichol and Rennell, the forced march of thousands of western Allied POWs from Stalag Luft VI at Heydekrug beginning in July 1944 was the first of the series of marches known as the Long March. The POWs were marched either to Stalag Luft IV at Gross Tychow (a journey which also involved a 60-hour journey by ship to Swinemünde), or to Stalag XX-A at Thorn in Poland (with part of the distance covered by cattle train).

== The marches ==
January and February 1945 were among the coldest winter months of the 20th century in Europe, with blizzards and temperatures as low as –25 °C (–13 °F), and even until the middle of March, temperatures were well below 0 °C (32 °F). Most of the POWs were ill-prepared for the evacuation, having suffered years of poor rations and wearing clothing ill-suited to the appalling winter conditions.

In most camps, the POWs were broken up in groups of 250 to 300 men and because of the inadequate roads and the flow of battle, not all the prisoners followed the same route. The groups would march 20–40 km (12–25 mi) a day, resting in factories, churches, barns and even in the open. Soon long columns of POWs were wandering over the northern part of Germany with little or nothing in the way of food, clothing, shelter or medical care.

Prisoners from different camps had different experiences: sometimes the Germans provided farm wagons for those unable to walk. There seldom were horses available, so teams of POWs pulled the wagons through the snow. Sometimes the guards and prisoners became dependent on each other, other times the guards became increasingly hostile. Passing through some villages, the residents would throw bricks and stones, and in others, the residents would share their last food. Some groups of prisoners were joined by German civilians who were also fleeing from the Russians. Some who tried to escape or could not go on were shot by guards.

Those with intact boots had the dilemma of whether to remove them at night - if they left them on, trench foot could result; if they removed them, they may not get their swollen feet back into their boots in the morning or get frostbite. Worse still, the boots could freeze or be stolen.

Many Prisoners, due to severe malnutrition and poor health resorted to scavenging for food including various plants and smaller animals.

Because of the unsanitary conditions and a near starvation diet, hundreds of POWs died of disease along the way and many more were ill. Dysentery was common: according to Robert Schirmer, a Red Cross delegate in Germany, 80% of the POWs on the northern line of march were suffering from this disease. Sufferers had the indignity of soiling themselves whilst having to continue to march, and being further weakened by the debilitating effects of illness. Dysentery was easily spread from one group to another when they followed the same route and rested in the same places. Many POWs suffered from frostbite which could lead to gangrene. Typhus, spread by body lice, was a risk for all POWs, but was now increased by using overnight shelter previously occupied by infected groups. Some men simply froze to death in their sleep.

In addition to these conditions were the dangers from air attack by Allied forces mistaking the POWs for retreating columns of German troops. On 19 April 1945, at a village called Gresse, 30 Allied POWs died and 30 were seriously injured (possibly fatally) when strafed by a flight of RAF Typhoons.

As winter drew to a close, suffering from the cold abated and some of the German guards became less harsh in their treatment of POWs. But the thaw rendered useless the sledges made by many POWs to carry spare clothing, carefully preserved food supplies and other items. So, the route became littered with items that could not be carried. Some even discarded their greatcoats, hoping that the weather did not turn cold again. As the columns reached the western side of Germany they ran into the advancing western Allied armies. For some, this brought liberation. Others were not so lucky. They were marched towards the Baltic Sea, where Nazis were rumoured to be using POWs as human shields and hostages. It was later estimated that a large number of POWs had marched over 800 km (500 mi) by the time they were liberated, and some had walked nearly 1,500 km (930 mi).

New Zealander Norman Jardine explained how, once liberated, his group of POWs were given a revolver by a U.S. Army officer and told to shoot any guards who had treated them unfairly. He stated that "We did!"

On 4 May 1945 RAF Bomber Command implemented Operation Exodus, and the first prisoners of war were repatriated by air. Bomber Command flew 2,900 sorties over the next 23 days, carrying 72,500 prisoners of war.

== Total number of deaths ==
The total number of US POWs in Germany was in the region of 93,000-94,000 and official sources claim that 1,121 died. The British Commonwealth total was close to 180,000 and while no accurate records exist, if a similar casualty rate is assumed, the number who died would be around 2,200. Therefore, according to a report by the US Department of Veterans Affairs, almost 3,500 US and Commonwealth POWs died as a result of the marches. It is possible that some of these deaths occurred before the death marches, but the marches would have claimed the vast majority.

Nichol and Rennell, after detailed enquiries with the British authorities, concluded that no consolidated figures for deaths of British and Commonwealth POWs was kept. They are only able to put forward a "guess" of between 2,500 and 3,500 American, British and Commonwealth POW deaths on the marches.

Other estimates vary greatly, with one magazine for former POWs putting the number of deaths from the Gross Tychow march alone at 1,500. A senior YMCA official closely involved with the POW camps put the number of Commonwealth and American POW deaths at 8,348 between September 1944 and May 1945.

It is possible to get an impression of the casualty rate among Commonwealth POWs from the Commonwealth War Graves Commission website. The casualties of the March who have a known grave have mostly been reburied in the larger war cemeteries in Germany. In cemeteries away from the line of advance of Commonwealth troops, army (as opposed to air force) casualties from January 1945 onwards have a high chance of representing POWs who died on the March. For POW casualties with no known graves, their names should appear on a campaign memorial, such as the Dunkirk Memorial, and the date of death suggests whether or not it occurred on the March. Army casualties in 1945 buried at Durnbach War Cemetery, the Berlin 1939-1945 War Cemetery or appearing on the Dunkirk Memorial total 469; this must exclude RAF and Naval personnel, POWs buried in other cemeteries, or those with unknown graves who were taken prisoner in other campaigns. This may be consistent with the 2,200 estimated total shown above.

== Blame for the marches ==
SS Generalleutnant Gottlob Berger, who was put in charge of POW camps in 1944, was arrested and put on trial in the Ministries Trial in 1947. In 1949 there was an attempt to assign blame for the marches against Berger and the indictment read:

that between September 1944 and May 1945, hundreds of thousands of American and Allied prisoners of war were compelled to undertake forced marches in severe weather without adequate rest, shelter, food, clothing and medical supplies; and that such forced marches, conducted under the authority of the defendant Berger, chief of Prisoner-of-War Affairs, resulted in great privation and deaths to many thousands of prisoners.

Berger argued that it was in fact the Germans' duty under the 1929 Geneva Convention to remove POWs from a potential combat zone, as long as it did not put their lives in even greater danger. He also claimed that the rapid advance of the Red Army had surprised the Germans, who had planned to transport the POWs by train. He stated that he had protested against the decision made by Hitler. According to Berger, he was "without power or authority to countermand or avoid the order". He was acquitted due to these statements and the lack of eyewitness evidence—most ex-POWs were completely unaware of the trial taking place.

However, in 1949, Berger was convicted for his role in the genocide of European Jews and sentenced to 25 years in prison. The sentence was reduced to 10 years in 1951 because of his refusal to kill the "Prominente" (famous or high-ranking Allied officers), who were held at Oflag IV-C (Colditz Castle), despite direct orders from Hitler. He had helped these prisoners escape by moving them to Bavaria and then to Austria where he met with them twice before they were returned to American forces. Berger claimed that he had saved the Prominente from Gestapo head Ernst Kaltenbrunner, who had sent agents to kill them.

Berger was released from prison in 1951 and died in 1975.

== Timeline of POW evacuations ==
Two survivors of the March pictured in front of a damaged Luftwaffe Arado Ar 96 at Celle Airfield on 18 April 1945.

- 13 July 1944 – -evacuation of Stalag Luft VI at Šilutė (Heydekrug) in Lithuania begins, to Stalag Luft IV at Gross Tychow involving a force march and 60hr journey by ship to Swinemünde, or by force march and cattle train to Stalag XX-A at Thorn in Poland.
- 24 December 1944 – POW work camps near Königsberg (now Kaliningrad) are evacuated.
- 27 December 1944 to April 1945 – POWs at Stalag VIII-B (formerly Stalag VIII-D) at Teschen began their forced march through Czechoslovakia, towards Dresden, then towards Stalag XIII-D at Nuremberg and finally on to Stalag VII-A at Moosburg in Bavaria.
- 12 January 1945 – Red Army launched offensive in Poland and East Prussia.
- 19 January 1945 – evacuation from Stalag Luft 7 at Bankau, near Kluczbork, Poland, begins in blizzard conditions – 1,500 prisoners were force marched then loaded onto cattle trucks and taken to Stalag III-A at Luckenwalde, south of Berlin. Evacuation of work party 344 at (Piaski), part of Stalag VIIB, prisoners commenced march on foot.
- 20 January 1945 – Stalag XX-A at Thorn, Poland, started evacuation.
- 21 January 1945 - Oflag 64 at Szubin, Poland was evacuated.
- 22 January 1945 – Stalag 344 at Lamsdorf, Silesia was evacuated.
- 23 January 1945 – Evacuation began at Stalag XX-B at Marienburg, Danzig.
- 27 January 1945 to February 1945 – evacuation began at Stalag Luft III, Sagan, to either Stalag III-A at Luckenwalde, 30 km south of Berlin, or to Marlag und Milag Nord, near Bremen, or to Stalag XIII-D, near Nuremberg, then onto Stalag VII-A near Moosburg, Bavaria.
- 29 January 1945 - Stalag IID Stargard (now Stargard Szczeciński, Poland) was evacuated. Almost a thousand men struggled into formation. There were about five-hundred Russians, two-hundred Frenchmen, one-hundred Americans and twenty-five Canadians in the march. The POWs were put on a forced march along a northern route in blizzard conditions via Settin (Szczecin) to arrive at Stalag II-A, Neubrandenburg on 7 February 1945.
- 6 February 1945 to March 1945 – Evacuation from Stalag Luft IV at Gross Tychow, Pomerania began an eighty-six-day forced march to Stalag XI-B and Stalag 357 at Fallingbostel. Many prisoners were then marched from here at the end of the war towards Lübeck.
- 8 February 1945 – Stalag VIII-C at Sagan was evacuated. The POWs marched across Germany to Stalag IX-B near Bad Orb, and arrive there 16 March.
- 10 February 1945 – Stalag VIII-A at Görlitz was evacuated.
- 14 February 1945 – Commonwealth and US bomber squadrons attacked Dresden.
- 19 March 1945 – Hitler issued the Nero Decree.
- 3 April 1945 – Stalag XIII-D at Nuremberg was evacuated.
- 6 April 1945 – Stalag XI-B and Stalag 357 at Fallingbostel were evacuated.
- 16 April 1945 – Oflag IV-C, (Colditz Castle), was liberated.
- 16 April 1945 – POWs left behind at Fallingbostel were liberated by the British Second Army.
- 17 April 1945 – Bergen-Belsen concentration camp was liberated.
- 19 April 1945 – POW column was attacked by allied aircraft at Gresse resulting in 60 fatalities.
- 22 April 1945 – Stalag III-A at Luckenwalde was liberated by Soviet forces.
- 27 April 1945 – US and Soviet forces met at the River Elbe.
- 29 April 1945 – Stalag VII-A at Moosburg was liberated by Patton's Third United States Army.
- 30 April 1945 – Berlin falls to the Red Army and Hitler commits suicide.
- 4 May 1945 – German forces surrendered on Lüneburg Heath.
- 10 May 1945 – The last POWs evacuated from Stalag 357 / Stalag XI-B at Fallingbostel are liberated.
- 12 May 1945 – The Red Army releases Commonwealth and US POWs at Stalag III-A, Luckenwalde.

== See also ==
- Sandakan Death Marches
- James "Dixie" Deans
- Bataan Death March
- Death marches (Holocaust)
- Phil Lamason
- List of German World War II POW camps
- Prisoner of war
- Prisoner-of-war camp

== Bibliography ==
- Goodman, W.E. "Bill" (2013). Of Stirlings and Stalags: An air-gunner's tale. PublishNation.
- Kydd, Sam (1974). For You The War Is Over Futura.
- Maguire, Peter H. (2013). Law and War: International Law and American History, Revised Edition. New York, New York: Columbia University Press. ISBN 978-0-231-51819-2.
- Morrison, Charles (1989). We've Been A Long Time Coming Boys. Albyn Press. ISBN 0-284-98840-5
- MacMahon, John (1995). Almost a Lifetime. Shamrock Publications, Salt Spring Island BC ISBN 978-0-9684454-0-2
- Nichol and Rennell (2003). The Last Escape. Viking, New York.
- The Long March to Freedom (The Long March to Freedom at IMDb)- 3-part video documentary, dir. Stephen Saunders - ASA, Stafford, 2011.
