= Bąków, Kluczbork County =

Bąków
- Village
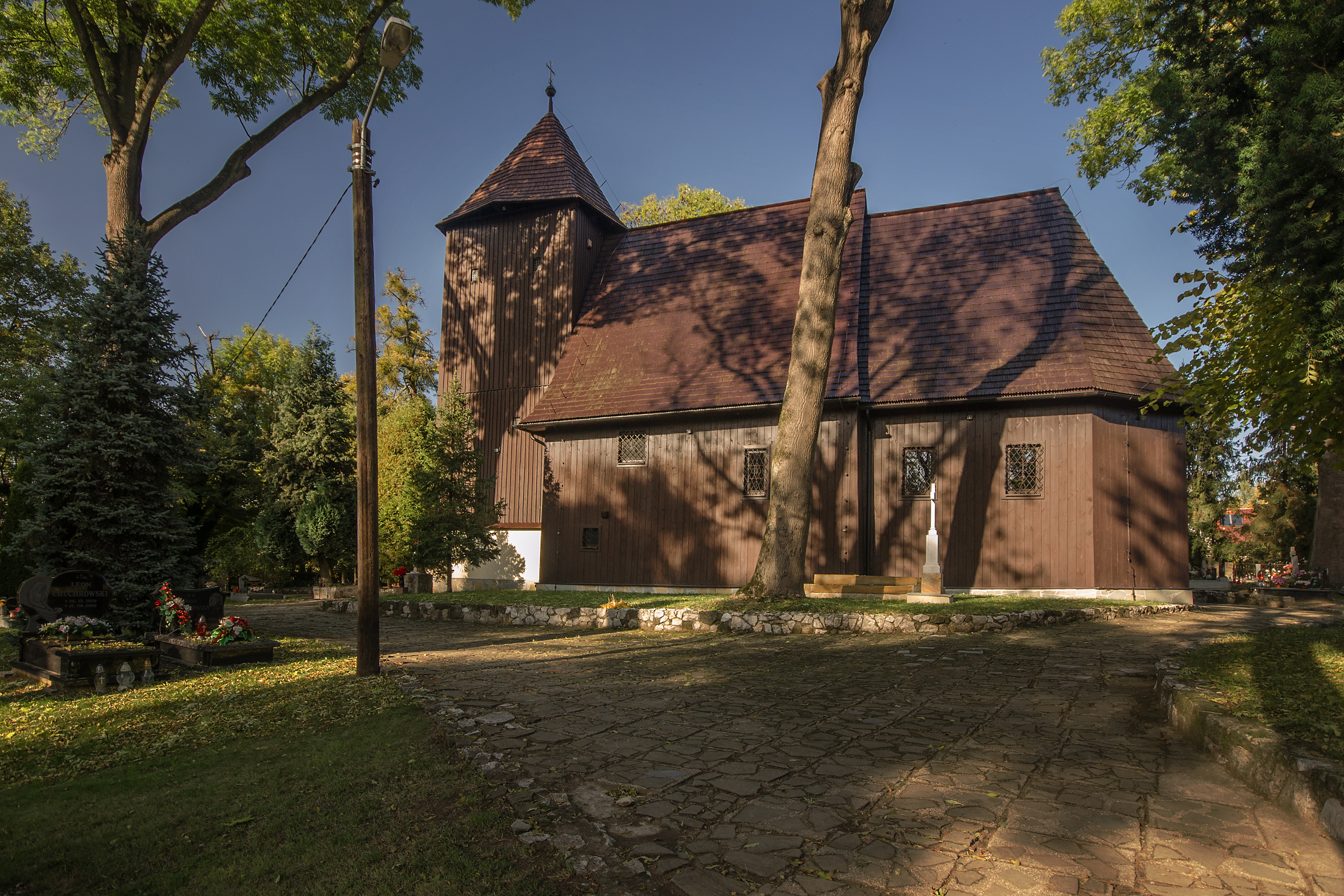
- Church of the Assumption in Bąków

- Location within Poland
- Coordinates: 50°58′N 18°19′E
- Country: Poland
- Voivodeship: Opole
- County: Kluczbork
- Gmina: Kluczbork
- First mentioned: 1258
- Population: 1,400
- Time zone: UTC+1 (CET)
  - Summer (DST): UTC+2 (CEST)
- Vehicle registration: OKL
- Website: www.bakow.pl

Bąków ([ˈbɔnkuf]) is a village in the administrative district of Gmina Kluczbork, within Kluczbork County, Opole Voivodeship, in south-western Poland.

== History ==
The village was first mentioned in 1258, when it was part of fragmented Piast-ruled Poland. In the past, it was also known in Polish as Bęk.

During World War II, in 1944, the Germans relocated the Stalag Luft 7 prisoner-of-war camp from Morzyczyn to Bąków. It housed Allied POWs of various nationalities, including British, Canadian, American, Polish, Australian, New Zealander, South African, French and Dutch. On 19 January 1945, the Germans evacuated the camp in a death march, which reached the Stalag III-A camp in Luckenwalde on February 8. Following Germany's defeat in the war, the village became again part of Poland.

== Sights ==
Heritage sites of Bąków include the old wooden Church of the Assumption and a historic palace.

== Transport ==
There is a train station in Bąków. The Polish National road 11 passes through the village.

== Notable residents ==
- Walter Scheunemann (1909–1949), German Wehrmacht officer
- Otto Hoffmann von Waldau (1898–1943), German Luftwaffe general
