= Stalag Luft 7 =

- Bankau (Bąków), Silesia

Site information
- Type: Prisoner-of-war camp
- Controlled by: Nazi Germany

Location
- Coordinates: 50.966667°N 18.316667°E

Site history
- In use: 1943–1945
- Battles/wars: World War II

Garrison information
- Occupants: British, Canadian, Australian, New Zealander, French, Polish, South African, American and other Allied airmen

Stalag Luft 7 was a World War II Luftwaffe prisoner-of-war camp located in Morzyczyn, Pomerania, and Bankau, Silesia (now Bąków, Poland). It held British, Canadian, Australian, New Zealander, French, Polish, South African, American and other Allied airmen.

== History ==
The camp was established at an airfield in Morzyczyn in 1943, and then relocated to a remote wooded area near Bąków, where it was opened on 6 June 1944, for RAF NCO flying crews and by July held 230 prisoners. They were joined by members of the Glider Pilot Regiment captured at the Battle of Arnhem in September 1944. By 1 January 1945, the camp held 1,578 prisoners. This was made up of 1,075 British, 252 Canadian, 134 Australian, 26 New Zealand, 24 French, 15 Polish, 14 South African, 11 Irish and 10 US. Others were Rhodesian, Maltese, Dutch, Belgian and Czech. The International Committee of the Red Cross described the conditions of the camp as "deplorable".

On 19 January 1945, 68 sick POWs were evacuated to the Ilag VIII/Z camp in Kluczbork, whereas remaining 1,565 POWs were sent on a death march in bitter cold with temperatures dropping to −20 °C (−4 °F). They crossed a bridge over the river Oder at Mikolin on 21 January, reached Goldberg (Złotoryja) on 5 February, and were loaded onto a train. On 8 February they reached Stalag III-A located about 52 km (32 mi) south of Berlin near Luckenwalde, which already held 20,000 prisoners, consisting mainly of soldiers from Britain, Canada, the U.S. and Russia.

== See also ==
- List of prisoner-of-war camps in Germany
