= Stalags XI-B, XI-D, and 357 =

WW2-era German PoW camps

Stalag XI-B / Stalag XI-D / Stalag 357
- Fallingbostel, Lower Saxony
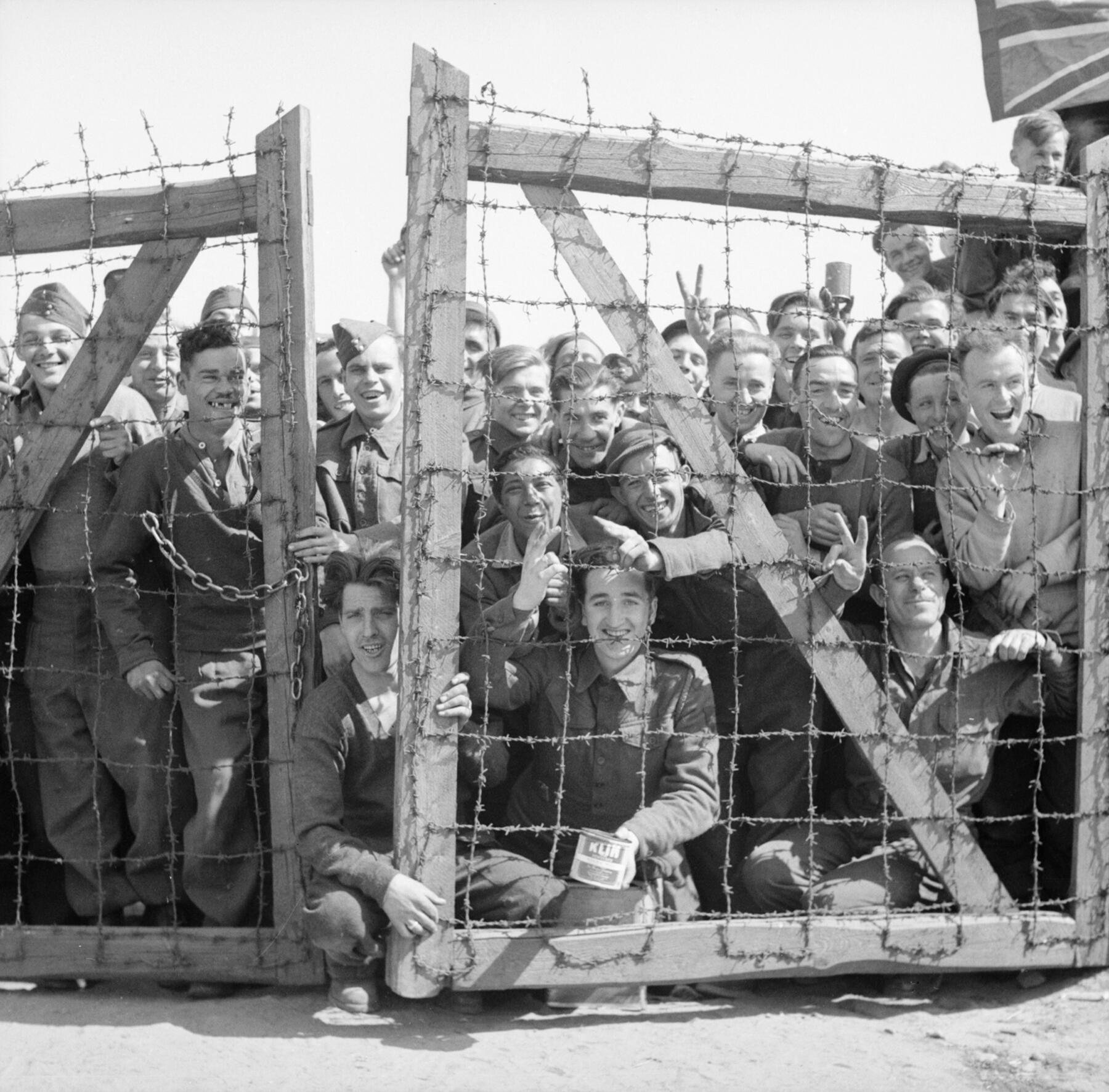
- POWs at Stalag XI-B welcome their liberators, 16 April 1945.

Site information
- Type: Prisoner-of-war camp
- Controlled by: Nazi Germany

Location
- Fallingbostel, Germany (pre-war borders, 1937)
- Coordinates: 52.85795°N 9.72015°E

Site history
- In use: 1939–1945
- Battles/wars: World War II

Garrison information
- Occupants: Polish, French, Belgian, Soviet, Italian, British, Yugoslav, American, Canadian, New Zealander and other Allied POWs

Stalag XI-B and Stalag XI-D / 357 were two German World War II prisoner-of-war camps (Stammlager) located just to the east of the town of Fallingbostel in Lower Saxony, in north-western Germany. The camps housed Polish, French, Belgian, Soviet, Italian, British, Yugoslav, American, Canadian, New Zealander and other Allied POWs.

== Camp history ==
=== Stalag XI-B ===
The camp was built in 1937 as accommodation for workers building the barracks at the nearby Westlager ("Western Camp") of Truppenübungsplatz Bergen ("Military Training Area Bergen"). In September 1939 the huts were fenced in and designated Stalag XI-B. The first prisoners to arrive were Poles in late 1939, followed by French and Belgians the following year. By the end of 1940 around 40,000 POW were registered there, although only about 2,500 of these were housed at the camp, with the majority assigned to various Arbeitskommando ("work team") in the area. Close by were the barracks of Landesschützen-Bataillon 461 ("Local Defence Battalion 461"), who guarded the camp. This Army unit was composed of men considered too old or otherwise unfit for front-line service, and were commonly used for guard and garrison duties.

In the final stages of World War II, in 1945, the Germans evacuated Canadian prisoners of war from the Stalag II-D prisoner-of-war camp in Stargard to Stalag XI-B.

=== Stalag XI-D ===
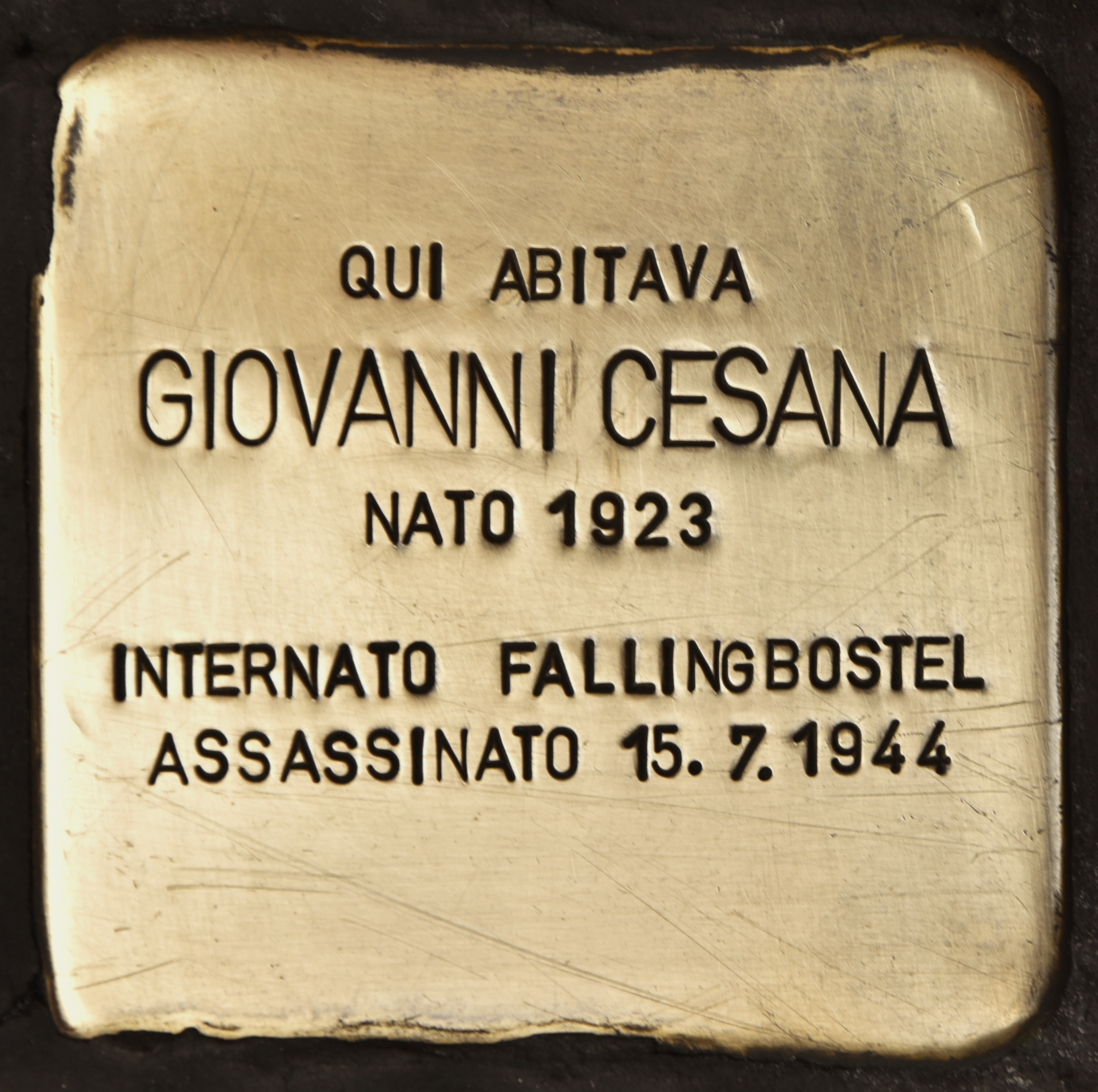
Stolperstein in Carate Brianza for Giovanni Cesana, an Italian Gentile who was imprisoned in Fallingbostel after the Armistice of Cassibile, dying there in July 1944.

In July 1941 the first Soviet POWs arrived, and were accommodated in a large fenced-off open area called Marquartsfeld about 1 km (0.62 mi) north-east of Stalag XI-B, and designated Stalag XI-D (also known as Stalag 321). Lacking huts the Russian prisoners initially lived in dugouts. Another 10,000 Soviet officers were accommodated in XI-B. In late 1941 the SS separated out the senior officers, Communist Party officials and Jews from the Soviet POW, and sent them to the concentration camps at Sachsenhausen and Neuengamme. By November 1941 there were about 11,000 Soviet POW in XI-D, and some huts were built. The same month an epidemic of typhus broke out in both camps which lasted until February 1942. In early 1942 rations for the Soviet prisoners were slightly increased in order to enable them to work, however it was still so inadequate that many prisoners died from exhaustion. In July 1942 Stalag XI-D was dissolved and incorporated into Stalag XI-B.

In late 1943 a large number of Italian POW arrived at XI-B. They were poorly treated and suffered, second to the Russians, the most deaths in the camp. By mid-1944 there were 93,380 POW registered at XI-B; 25,277 Russian, and 79,928 of other nationalities, mostly in Arbeitskommando.

=== Stalag 357 ===
In September 1944 Stalag 357 was moved from Toruń in German-occupied Poland to the site of the former XI-D, with construction being carried out by the Italian POW from XI-B. This new camp was used to house mostly British and Commonwealth POWs. In November 1944 British paratroops captured at Arnhem arrived at Stalag 357. Led by the formidable RSM John C. Lord of the 3rd Battalion, Parachute Regiment, they set about raising the standards of the camp. Lord insisted on proper military discipline with regular exercise and parades. At that time 17,000 POW; mostly British, but also Russian, Polish, Yugoslav, French, and American prisoners were crammed into the camp causing severe overcrowding. Each hut contained 400 men, though it had bunks for only 150. By February 1945 the POW of XI-B and 357 were suffering from lack of food and medical supplies exacerbated by the influx of several hundred American POW captured in the Battle of the Bulge and Operation Nordwind. These newer arrivals found themselves accommodated in tents.

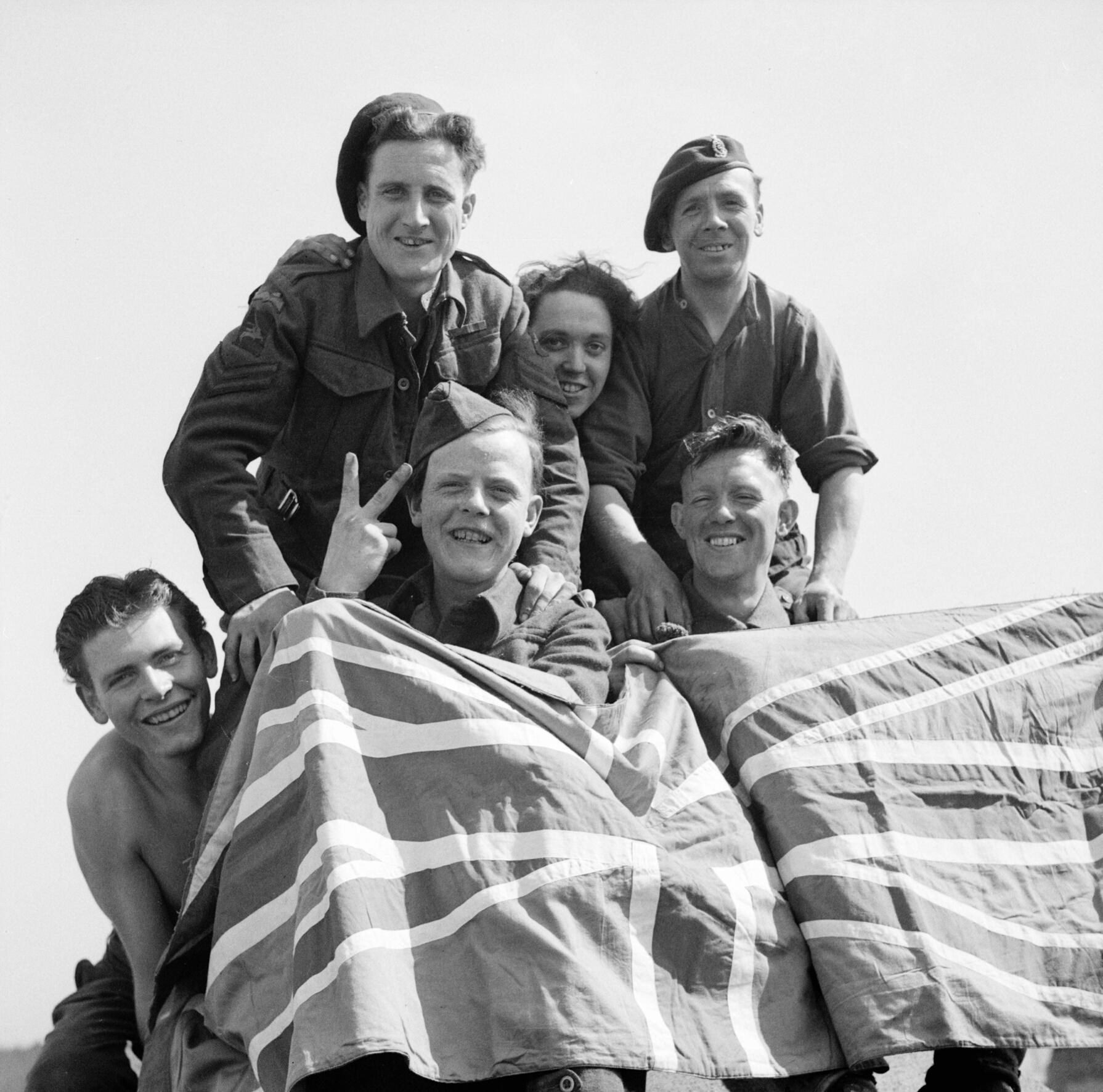
British Prisoners of War celebrate their liberation from Stalag XI-B, 16 April 1945.

In early April 1945 Sergeant Pilot James 'Dixie' Deans RAF, the camp leader of 357, was informed by the Commandant Oberst Hermann Ostmann that 12,000 British POW were being evacuated from the camp in the face of the Allied advance. RSM Lord had also been selected to leave, but hid under the floor of a hut for five days in order to avoid it. The men marched from the camp in columns of 2,000. After 10 days they arrived at Gresse, east of the Elbe. There they were issued with Red Cross parcels, but were then mistaken for German troops and strafed by British Typhoon fighter-bombers. Sixty POW were killed and many wounded. Deans confronted Oberst Ostmann and bluntly gave him a choice, to be captured to the Russians or the British. Ostman provided Deans with a pass and a German guard, and Deans headed west to contact the advancing British troops. On 1 May Deans and his guard were sheltering in a house east of Lauenberg when they heard over the radio the news of the death of Adolf Hitler. The next morning the house was overrun by troops of the British 6th Airborne. Deans was taken to the commander of VIII Corps and explained the situation. He was given a captured Mercedes car and drove back to Gresse. Two days later the POW column marched back across the British lines.

Meanwhile, the camps at Fallingbostel had been liberated on 16 April 1945 by British troops from B Squadron 11th Hussars and the Reconnaissance Troop of the 8th Hussars. They were met at the main gate of Stalag 357 by a guard of Airborne troops, impeccably attired and led by RSM Lord.

=== Post-war ===
Post-war Stalag XI-B was used by the British as an Internment Camp for members of the Nazi Party. It then served as an accommodation centre for German refugees and displaced persons. Eventually the camp was demolished, and a housing estate now occupies most of the area, with the only surviving structure being the delousing hut. Fallingbostel was until 2015, a base of the British 7th Armoured Brigade of British Forces Germany.

== Arbeitskommando ==
Stalag IX-B was the administrative centre for POW work details in the region. At its peak there were about 80,000 POW working in 1,500 Arbeitskommando in agriculture and industry. Although prohibited under the Third Geneva Convention, POW from Stalag IX-B also worked in munitions factories.

== Deaths ==
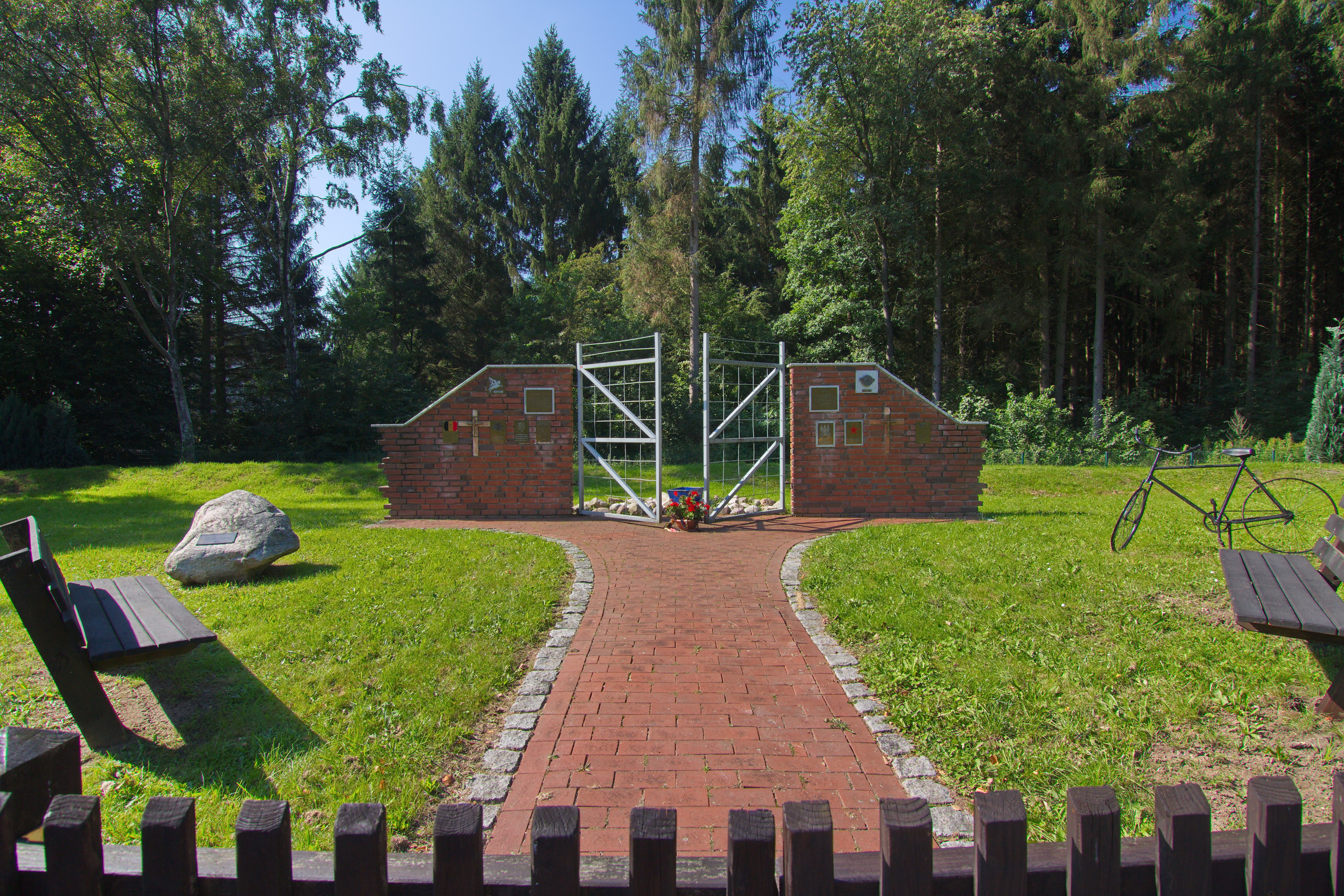
Memorial Gates dedicated to POWs of 13 nations who were imprisoned in Stalag XI-B, XI-D and 357

In total around 30,000 Soviet POWs died in Stalag XI-B and XI-D. Another 734 POW from the United States, Belgium, Britain, France, Italy, Yugoslavia, South Africa, Canada, Netherlands, Poland and Slovakia died in XI-B and 357. The Soviet POW and the remains of 273 others are buried at the "Cemetery of the Nameless" in Oerbke.

== Memorials ==
On 16 April 2005, the 60th Anniversary of the camp's liberation, the Stalag XI-B (357) POW Memorial Gates were unveiled, dedicated to the POW of 13 nations who were imprisoned in Stalag XI-B, XI-D and 357 from 1939 to 1945.

== See also ==
- List of prisoner-of-war camps in Germany
