= Dixie Deans (RAF airman) =

Royal Air Force sergeant (1914–1989)

James Alexander Graham "Dixie" Deans MBE (25 January 1914 – 18 February 1989) was a Royal Air Force sergeant and Second World War bomber pilot shot down in 1940 who became a renowned prisoner of war (POW) camp leader. Deans spoke perfect German and when captured commanded his fellow POWs as the elected camp leader, gaining the respect and trust of both prisoners and German captors alike. In 1945, he guided 2,000 Allied POWs across Europe as part of what is known as the 'Long March'.

On 10 September 1940, Deans took off from Linton-on-Ouse in a Whitley bomber of No. 77 Squadron RAF to attack Bremen. His aircraft was hit by flak and crash-landed at Venebrugge (Overijssel), east north-east of Zwolle, Holland.

Deans was imprisoned first at Stalag Luft I, then moved to Stalag Luft III, where as camp leader he held meetings with the Germans on behalf of the non-commissioned officer POWs.

He was then transferred to Stalag Luft VI at Heydekrug in Memelland, now Lithuania. As at his previous camps, he set up covert intelligence gathering networks and the use of radios built in the camps obtained through bribery of selected guards. This enabled the POWs to keep up to date with events from the BBC. He was also responsible for helping to organise the passing of secret information to MI9 via specially coded letters.

In March 1945, Deans took charge of 2,000 POWs on a month-long march across Poland and Germany, in what became known as one of the 'Long Marches', to Stalag XI-B at Fallingbostel. From there, Deans and the thousands of POWs were marched north-east towards Lübeck. Deans took charge of the daily details of survival on the march and bullied the Germans left in charge for food, transport for the sick, and for better overnight accommodation. He also demanded that the German commandant, Oberst Ostmann, allow him to set off to warn the approaching British armies of the POW columns ahead. He made contact with the British Army and on returning guided his men to safety and accepted Ostmann's surrender.

When Deans returned home to England, he found work as an executive officer at the London School of Economics, until he retired in 1977. Shortly after the war, Deans was diagnosed with multiple sclerosis, which he fought for the rest of his life.

Deans was awarded the MBE.

Deans was a founder member and first president of the RAF Ex-POW Association; he is also listed as a contributor to Cornelius Ryan's book The Last Battle.

== See also ==
- Prisoner-of-war camp
- List of German World War II POW camps
- Death marches (Holocaust)
