= Stalag III-A =

German World War II prisoner-of-war camp

- Luckenwalde, Brandenburg
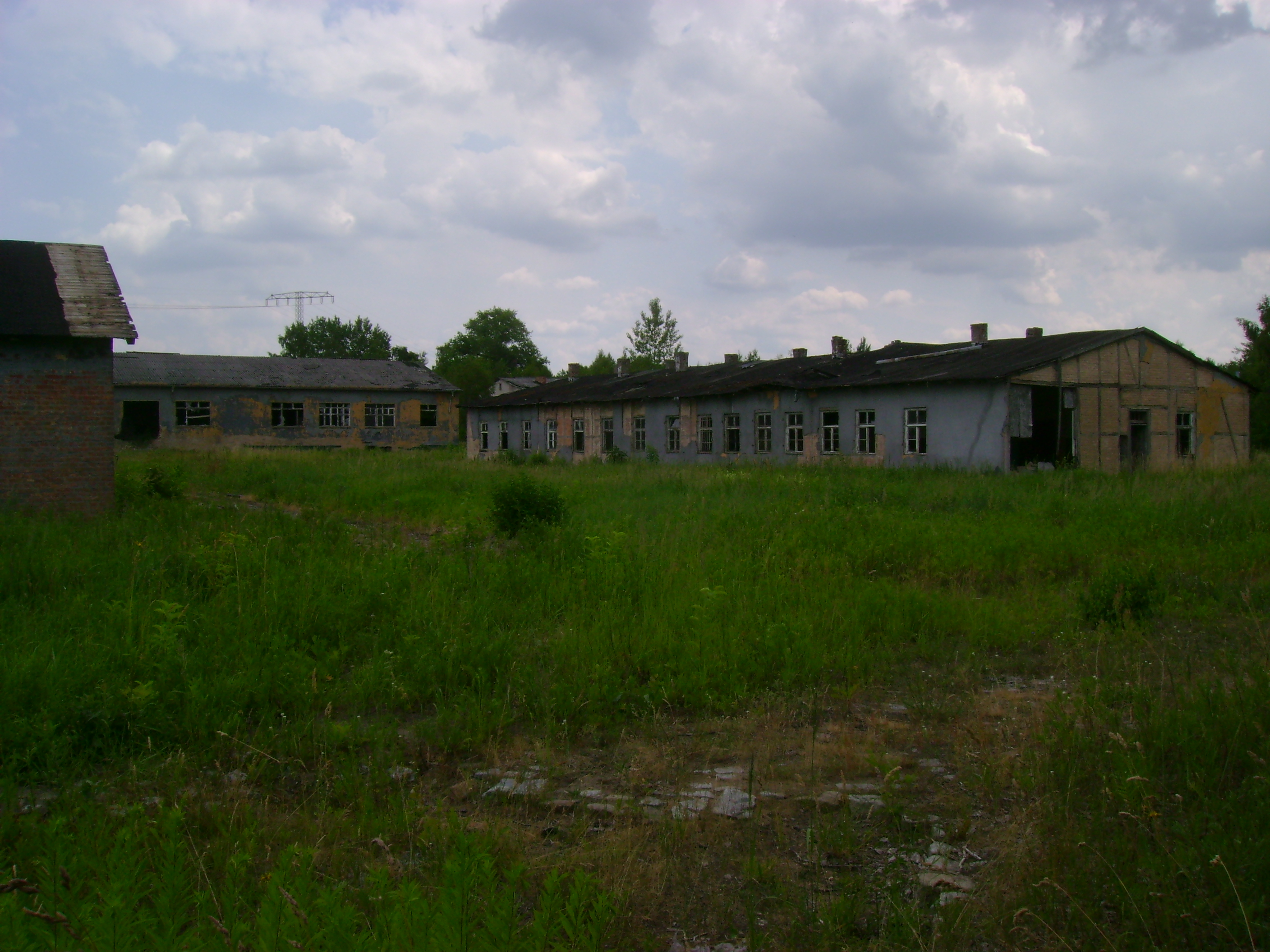
- Former headquarters building of Stalag III-A Luckenwalde, 2010

Site information
- Type: Prisoner-of-war camp
- Controlled by: Nazi Germany

Location
- Luckenwalde, Germany (pre-war borders, 1937)
- Coordinates: 52.0583°N 13.1147°E

Site history
- In use: 1939–1945
- Battles/wars: World War II

Garrison information
- Occupants: Polish, French, Italian, Russian, Serbian, American, British, Dutch, Norwegian and Romanian prisoners

Stalag III-A was a German World War II prisoner-of-war (POW) camp at Luckenwalde, Brandenburg, 52 kilometres (32 mi) south of Berlin. It housed Polish, Dutch, Belgian, French, Yugoslav, Russian, Italian, American, Romanian, British and other POWs.

== History ==
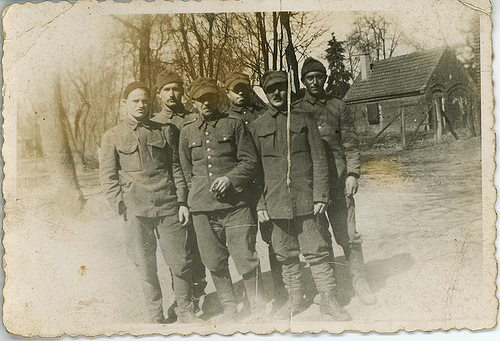
A group of Polish prisoners of war at Stalag III-A. The 2nd POW from the left is pvt. Jan Sysio (prisoner's number 1843) from the Rifles Regiment. Taken somewhere between October 1939 and November 1940.

Planning for the camp commenced before the invasion of Poland, which started World War II. It was designed to hold 10,000 men, was the largest in the 3rd Military District, and was considered a model for other camps.

In mid-September 1939 the first Polish POWs arrived, and were housed in large 12 m (39 ft) by 35 m (115 ft) tents, and set to work building the barrack huts before the winter set in. Once their work was complete the Poles were relocated, and the first inhabitants of the camp were Dutch and Belgian. They only remained there for a brief time before being replaced by 43,000 French POWs, who arrived in mid-1940, and remained the largest group of prisoners until the end of the war. They included 4,000 Africans from French colonial units. In 1941 some 300 of these took part in the Nazi propaganda film Germanin. The French were joined in 1941 by Yugoslav and Russian prisoners, then in late 1943 some 15,000 Italian military internees arrived, though most were quickly dispersed to other camps. In late 1944 small numbers of American, Romanian, British and Polish prisoners arrived, including Polish insurgents of the Warsaw Uprising aged 14–17. In January 1945, a group of Polish officers was brought to the camp from German-occupied Hungary.

More than 200,000 prisoners passed through the Stalag III-A, and at its height in May 1944 there were a total of 48,600 POW registered there. No more than 8,000 were ever housed at the main camp, with the rest sent out to work in forestry and industry in more than 1,000 Arbeitskommando ("Work Companies") spread out over the entire state of Brandenburg.

As of January 1, 1945, it housed 45,942 POWs, including 24,996 French, 12,517 Soviet, 4,093 Serbian, 1,499 American, 1,433 British, 1,310 Italian, 86 Polish and 8 Romanian.

In early 1945, some 1,000 POWs from the Stalag VIII-C and Stalag Luft III were brought to Stalag III-A, and also POWs from the Stalag XXI-C in Wolsztyn and Stalag Luft 7 in Bąków. In February 1945 prisoners from Stalag III-B Furstenberg were evacuated to Stalag III-A, adding to the already overcrowded and unhygienic conditions. Finally, as the Russians approached the guards fled the camp leaving the prisoners to be liberated by the Red Army on 22 April 1945.

=== Conditions ===
The camp was generally run according to the guidelines of the Geneva Convention and the Hague Regulations, and was regularly inspected by representatives of the International Committee of the Red Cross (ICRC). Russian POWs were excluded from this on the grounds that the USSR was not a signatory of the Geneva Convention, and had significantly poorer conditions as a result. Italians were also generally maltreated. The French, British and Americans were treated relatively well.

In regards to Poles, the Germans violated the Geneva Conventions, by forcing them to relinquish their POW status to become civilian forced laborers. The Germans attempted to achieve this by deporting the Poles to more severe forced labour subcamps or threatening them with deportation to Nazi concentration camps. Polish prisoner Józef Dziurawiec recalled the poor conditions, including widespread starvation and diseases, including typhus, dysentery and pediculosis.

Italian prisoner Michele Zotta later reported that for the first few days of his imprisonment he slept on the ground in a small tent. As to rations, on the first day he received one kilogram of rye bread to share with fifteen other prisoners, with some butter and jelly. From then on the daily routine was for the Germans to distribute a bucket of potatoes to be shared between twenty-five prisoners. Zotta also notes that when prisoners collapsed the Germans would beat them.

=== Deaths ===
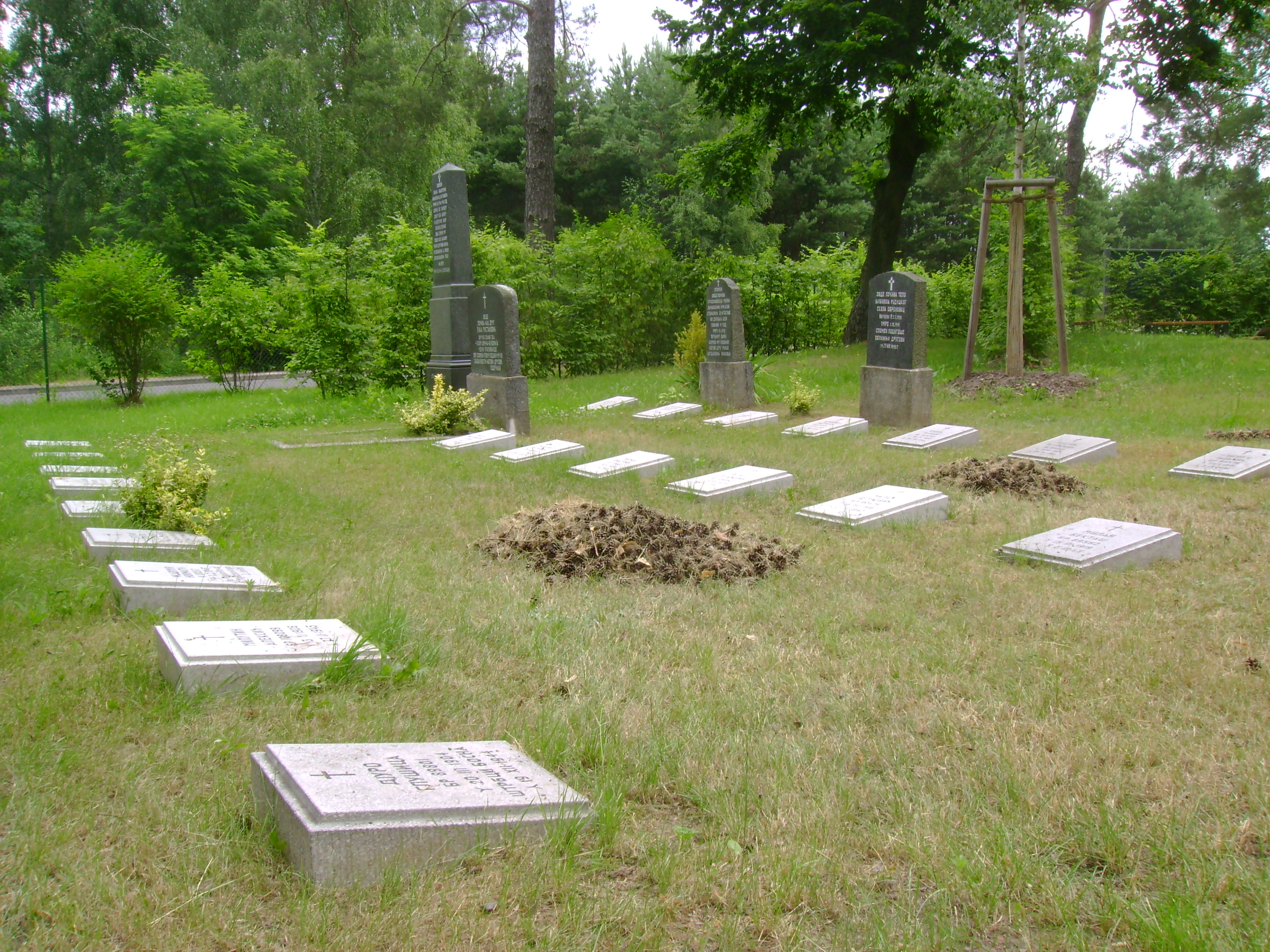
Cemetery of Stalag III-A

It is estimated that 4,000 to 5,000 prisoners died while in the camp. During the winter of 1941/42 a typhus epidemic killed around 2,000-2,500 Soviets, whose mortality rate was much higher than that of other nations. Non-Soviet dead were buried with military honours in individual graves at the camp cemetery, while Soviets were buried anonymously in mass graves.

== Notable POWs ==
- Michał Antoniewicz, Polish Olympic medalist in equestrian
- Stefan Mieczysław Grzybowski, professor and rector of the Jagiellonian University
- Phil Lamason, Royal New Zealand Air Force officer pilot
- Józef Warszawski, Polish priest, philosopher and Polish resistance member
- Joseph Samson, founder of the French company Emballages Samson, was one of the few prisoners who managed to escape from a German prison

== See also ==
- List of German prisoner-of-war camps
