= Teltow-Fläming II =

State electoral district of Germany

24: Teltow-Fläming II
- Electoral district for the Landtag of Brandenburg
- Teltow-Fläming II in 2024
- District: Teltow-Fläming
- Electorate: 39,366 (2024)
- Major settlements: Jüterbog and Luckenwalde

Current electoral district
- Created: 1994
- Party: SPD
- Member: Erik Stohn

Teltow-Fläming II is an electoral constituency (German: Wahlkreis) represented in the Landtag of Brandenburg. It elects one member via first-past-the-post voting. Under the constituency numbering system, it is designated as constituency 24. It is located in within the district of Teltow-Fläming.

== Geography ==
The constituency includes the towns of Jüterbog and Luckenwalde, as well as the communities of Niederer Fläming and Niedergörsdorf, and the district of Dahme.

There were 39,366 eligible voters in 2024.

== Members ==
Election	Member	Party	%
2004	Kornelia Wehlan	PDS	35.2
2009	Kornelia Wehlan	Left	36.8
2014	Erik Stohn	SPD	37.3
2019	Erik Stohn	SPD	32.6
2024	Erik Stohn	SPD	38.8

== Election results ==
=== 2024 election ===
State election (2024): Teltow-Fläming II
Notes:	Blue background denotes the winner of the electorate vote. Pink background denotes a candidate elected from their party list. Yellow background denotes an electorate win by a list member, or other incumbent. A ✓ or ✗ denotes status of any incumbent, win or lose respectively.						
Party	Candidate	Votes	%	±%	Party votes	%	±%
SPD	✓ Erik Stohn	10,119	38.9	▲6.3	9,054	33.4	▲2.1
AfD					8,674	32.0	▲6.6
Independent	Arne Onni Raue	6,097	23.4				
BSW					3,562	13.1	
CDU	Schmidt	4,166	16.0	▲2.2	2,682	9.9	▼3.6
APT					590	2.2	▼0.6
BVB/FW	Schreiber	2,818	10.8	▲2.4	544	2.0	▼2.9
Left	Thier	1,886	7.2	▼4.2	851	3.1	▼7.5
FDP	Gruhl	534	2.1	▼0.5	166	0.6	▼2.5
Greens	Krebs	407	1.6	▼5.2	584	2.2	▼5.0
Plus					192	0.7	▼0.3
DLW					128	0.5	
Values					128	0.5	
Third Way					19	0.1	
DKP					19	0.1	
Informal votes		1,455			349		
Total valid votes		26,027			27,133		
Turnout		27,482	69.8	▲8.9			
SPD hold	Majority	4,122	15.5	▲7.2			

=== 2019 election ===
State election (2019): Teltow-Fläming II
Notes:	Blue background denotes the winner of the electorate vote. Pink background denotes a candidate elected from their party list. Yellow background denotes an electorate win by a list member, or other incumbent. A ✓ or ✗ denotes status of any incumbent, win or lose respectively.						
Party	Candidate	Votes	%	±%	Party votes	%	±%
SPD	✓ Erik Stohn	7,899	32.6	▼1.8	7,590	31.3	▼6.0
AfD	Birgit Bessin	5,875	24.3	▲13.6	6,159	25.4	▲14.1
CDU	Felix Menzel	3,354	13.8	▼5.5	3,262	13.5	▼6.4
Left	Felix Thier	2,772	11.4	▼14.1	2,589	10.7	▼10.4
BVB/FW	Wilfried Rauhut	2,048	8.5	▲4.9	1,184	4.9	▲3.1
Greens	Klaus-Peter Gust	1,645	6.8	▲1.7	1,730	7.1	▲3.3
FDP	Jovita Anna Emilia Glaster-Döring	627	2.6	▲1.2	754	3.1	▲1.9
Tierschutzpartei					675	2.8	
Pirates					146	0.6	▼0.3
ÖDP					108	0.4	
V-Partei3					50	0.2	
Informal votes		371			344		
Total valid votes		24,220			24,247		
Turnout		24,591	61.0	▲16.8			
SPD hold	Majority	2,024	8.3	▼0.6			

=== 2014 election ===
State election (2014): Teltow-Fläming II
Notes:	Blue background denotes the winner of the electorate vote. Pink background denotes a candidate elected from their party list. Yellow background denotes an electorate win by a list member, or other incumbent. A ✓ or ✗ denotes status of any incumbent, win or lose respectively.						
Party	Candidate	Votes	%	±%	Party votes	%	±%
SPD	Erik Stohn	6,188	34.4	▲5.7	6,730	37.3	▲0.9
Left	Sigrid Maritta Böttcher	4,600	19.3	▼11.3	3,807	21.1	▼8.6
CDU	Sven Petke	3,477	19.3	▲0.3	3,592	19.9	▲2.5
AfD	Torsten Junker	1,936	10.7		2,046	11.3	
Greens	Klaus-Peter Gust	923	5.1	▲1.7	681	3.8	▲0.5
NPD					412	2.3	▲0.6
BVB/FW	Fritz Lindner	645	3.6	▲1.6	326	1.8	▲0.3
FDP	Manuel Hurtig	244	1.4	▼6.3	219	1.2	▼5.2
Pirates					163	0.9	
REP					41	0.2	Steady
DKP					38	0.2	Steady
Informal votes		368			326		
Total valid votes		18,013			18,055		
Turnout		18,381	44.2	▼20.3			
SPD gain from Left	Majority	1,588	8.9				

=== 2004 election ===
State election (2004): Teltow-Fläming II
Notes:	Blue background denotes the winner of the electorate vote. Pink background denotes a candidate elected from their party list. Yellow background denotes an electorate win by a list member, or other incumbent. A ✓ or ✗ denotes status of any incumbent, win or lose respectively.						
Party	Candidate	Votes	%	±%	Party votes	%	±%
PDS	Kornelia Wehlan	8,465	35.18		7,170	29.54	
SPD	Steffen Reiche	7,234	30.06		8,430	34.73	
CDU	Carola Hartfelder	4,936	20.51		4,330	17.84	
DVU					1,474	6.07	
AUB-Brandenburg	Thomas Willweber	971	4.04		184	0.76	
FDP	Dietrich Maetz	851	3.54		682	2.81	
AfW (Free Voters)	Peter Danzmann	691	2.87		235	0.97	
Greens	Ralf Danielewski	574	2.39		521	2.15	
Familie					519	2.14	
50Plus					214	0.88	
Gray Panthers					192	0.79	
BRB	Andreas Lust	342	1.42		176	0.73	
Yes Brandenburg					73	0.30	
DKP					53	0.22	
Schill					21	0.09	
Informal votes		733			523		
Total valid votes		24,064			24,274		
Turnout		24,797	55.68				
PDS win new seat	Majority	1,231	5.12				

== See also ==
- Politics of Brandenburg
- Landtag of Brandenburg
