= Macikai POW and GULAG camps =

Macikai POW and GULAG Camps
- Macikai near Šilutė, German/Soviet-occupied Lithuania
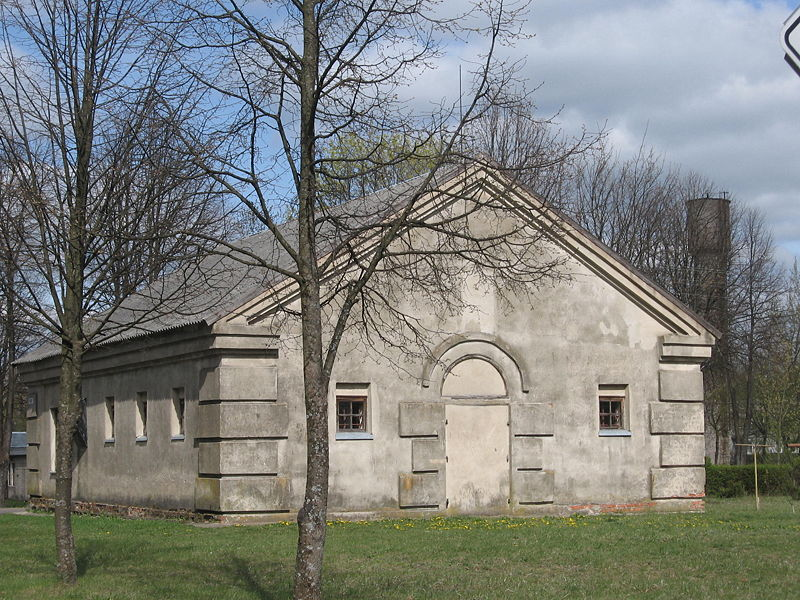
- Former building of the solitary cell, now a museum

Site information
- Type: Prisoner-of-war camp
- Controlled by: Nazi Germany, Soviet Union

Location
- Macikai, Lithuania
- Coordinates: 55.3569°N 21.51871°E

Site history
- In use: 1939–1955

Garrison information
- Occupants: Polish, Belgian, French, British, Canadian, American, Australian, New Zealand, Soviet, Czech, Dutch and Norwegian POWs (under Germany); German, Romanian, Hungarian, Austrian, Czech, Dutch, and Danish POWs, Lithuanian, Polish, Belarusian and Russian civilians, political prisoners, priests, criminals, etc. (under the Soviet Union)

Macikai POW and GULAG Camps is location of the German, later Soviet prisoner-of-war camp and the Soviet GULAG forced labor camp located near the village of Macikai (Matzicken) in German-occupied Lithuania and later, the Lithuanian SSR. The camp was opened and operated by Nazi Germany (1939–1944), and later became a Soviet prisoner-of-war camp No. 184 (1945–1948), finally transforming into a Soviet GULAG forced-labour camp (1945–1955).

== History ==
In the 17th century, Macikai was home to an estate manor, famous for its brewery. After the incorporation of Klaipėda Region into Lithuania in 1924, the Defence Ministry purchased some of the buildings of the former Macikai manor near Šilutė and repurposed them to use as barracks for the 7th Infantry Regiment's 2nd Battalion.

=== Nazi period ===
After the region was annexed by Germany in 1939, the barracks became Stalag 331, a POW camp. Later, it was renamed Stalag 1C Heydekrug, later still, Stalag Luft VI Heydekrug. First, the camp was used to hold Polish prisoners of war. Since 1940, captive Belgians and French would be interned there as well. In 1943, British and Canadian air force non-commissioned officers were held prisoners at the camp. Later on, a shipment of American, Australian, and even New Zealand POWs was brought to the camp. Soviet soldiers were also imprisoned in the camp.

According to US intelligence, at least 10,000 people could have been held at Macikai prior to the Soviet occupation. This number included a few Allied ace pilots. It was the northern-most POW camp within the bounds of the German Reich.

In October 1943, a group of British POWs organized a secret resistance movement in the camp. In cooperation with the Polish resistance movement, they organized escapes of British POWs through the port cities of Gdynia and Gdańsk to neutral Sweden. After an unsuccessful attempt by one English POW to escape on his own, the Gestapo discovered the British resistance and arrested its members.

As of April 1944, the camp held mostly British and American POWs, but also Canadians, Australians, New Zealanders, Poles, South Africans, Czechs, Dutchmen, Norwegians and a Belgian.

As the front line drew near in 1944, the prisoners were transferred to other camps. Most of them were brought by train to Stalag XX-A in Toruń in German-occupied Poland. Nearly 900 men brought to Klaipėda were shipped by the commercial vessel Instenburg to the port of Świnoujście (then Swinemunde) near Szczecin bay; the journey was 60 hours long. After that, they took a train and had to walk the rest of the way to Stalag Luft IV near Tychowo in today's Poland. Some of the prisoners died or were killed along the way. This march was one of the "Long Marches".

Numerous remains of prisoners from the Nazi Germany’s POW camp were discovered buried under a road in Village Armalėnai, Šilutė district, in 2011. An archaeological survey was done in 2020 to exhume the remains of more than 1,200 people. The remains were then buried next to the old cemeteries of the Macikai camps.

=== Soviet period ===
After the second Soviet occupation of Lithuania, the Soviets established in the former German prisoner-of-war camp first, their own POW camp and later a GULAG labor camp.

The German and Allied Prisoners-of-War Camp No. 184 operated from 1945 to 1948. Germans, Romanians, Hungarians, Austrians, the Czech, the Dutch, Danes and people of other nationalities were imprisoned there. In 1946, the camp was reorganized and renamed as the treatment camp; the seriously ill and physically exhausted prisoners of war were brought there from all camps in Lithuania. During this period, approximately 500 people died there;

The Gulag camp operated from 1945 to 1955. Civilians, political prisoners, priests, as well as women and children were imprisoned there. Most prisoners were Lithuanians, Russians, Poles, and Belarusians. The Soviets would imprison people in the Gulag camp for 'counter- revolutionary crimes' (members of the resistance movement, partisan supporters, farmers having failed to pay obligations, and people having fled exile). Criminals were also held in the camp. In 1948–1955, approximately 450 people died in the camp.

Political prisoners sentenced to 25 years of correctional work at the camp were held in a separate enclosed area. Even though official documents would often falsify the causes of prisoner deaths, it is a known fact that people would be executed by firing squad or exterminated in gas chambers; some of them would die from cold and hunger. The camp had a branch on Rusnė Island, which was founded in 1951 and held a population of around 200. In 1948 to 1955, nearly 450 people perished at the Macikai Gulag camp. Dead prisoners would be buried next to the camp. Currently, the cemetery is surrounded by a fence; however, there are no exact data as to how many people are actually buried there.

The Gulag camp was closed on June 18, 1955. After that, efforts were made to tear down the prisoner cemetery. An irrigation project for the territory of the cemetery was drawn in 1955. Even though the irrigation was never completed, the remaining area of the cemetery is now smaller, because its western side had been washed and eroded by the River Šyša for an extended period of time, and its northern and eastern territory was used as pastures and tilled land. In the second half of the 20th century, residential buildings were erected on a portion of the cemetery.

Mass graves of the Gulag camp in Macikai were discovered in 2020.

== Notable prisoners ==
- Bill Ash (RCAF), MBE, US-born British writer, Marxist, and serial escaper.
- Stanley Bolton, (RAF), sergeant shot down while flying a Lancaster Bomber, presumed dead but was captured. Escaped during "The March".
- Ernest Booth, a Flight Engineer, AR-R of 460 Squadron, Binbrook, a New Zealander who later became an All Blacks rugby player.
- James "Dixie" Deans (RAF), sergeant pilot, guided 2,000 Allied POWs across Germany in what was known as the "Long March".
- George Grimson (RAF), sergeant, notable for escaping many times and organising escapes.
- Frederick Tees, was a member of No. 617 Squadron of the Royal Air Force who was shot down during the 1943 Dambusters raid
- Peter Thomas, Baron Thomas of Gwydir (RAF), a Welsh Conservative politician.

== What remains ==
Today, the camp complex in Macikai consists of the camp-site, a solitary cell, the prisoner cemetery, a bath, and possibly barracks. In 1993, at the initiative of the Šilutė chapter of the Association of Exiles and Political Prisoners, the former building of the solitary cell was turned into a museum, which became a branch of the Hugo Scheu museum in Šilutė in 1995.

In 2019, the government of the Republic of Lithuania approved the plan for the management and memorialisation of the Macikai camps.

On September 25, 2020, Macikai hosted a solemn international ceremony to pay respect to the victims of the German POW camp and the Soviet GULAG camps (1939–1955) killed in Macikai. During the ceremony, the remains of the prisoners, which had been transferred from the discovered mass grave and re-interred near the old Macikai cemetery, were consecrated by Catholic, Evangelical Lutheran, and orthodox bishops.
