= Stohn =

Stohn is a surname. Notable people with the surname include:

- Erik Stohn (born 1983), German politician
- Stephen Stohn (born 1948), Canadian entertainment lawyer
