= Frederick Tees =

Royal Air Force airman (1922–1982)

- Sergeant Frederick Tees c.1943
- Born: 16 June 1922; Chichester, England
- Died: 12 March 1982 (aged 59); Letchworth, England
- Military career
- Allegiance: United Kingdom
- Branch: Royal Air Force
- Service years: 1941–1946
- Rank: Flight Sergeant
- Nicknames: Freddie; Frank
- Service number: 1332270
- Unit: No. 617 Squadron RAF
- Conflicts: Second World War: Operation Chastise
- Other work: Barber

Frederick Tees (16 June 1922 – 15 March 1982) was a member of No. 617 Squadron of the Royal Air Force who took part in Operation Chastise, the "Dambusters" raid of 1943, as a rear gunner. The raid was the inspiration for the 1955 film The Dam Busters. He ended his days as a barber in Letchworth.

== Early life ==
Tees was born in Chichester on 16 June 1922, the son of Henry Tees (1878–1944) and Elizabeth Gertrude Ayling (1885–1944).

== Second World War ==
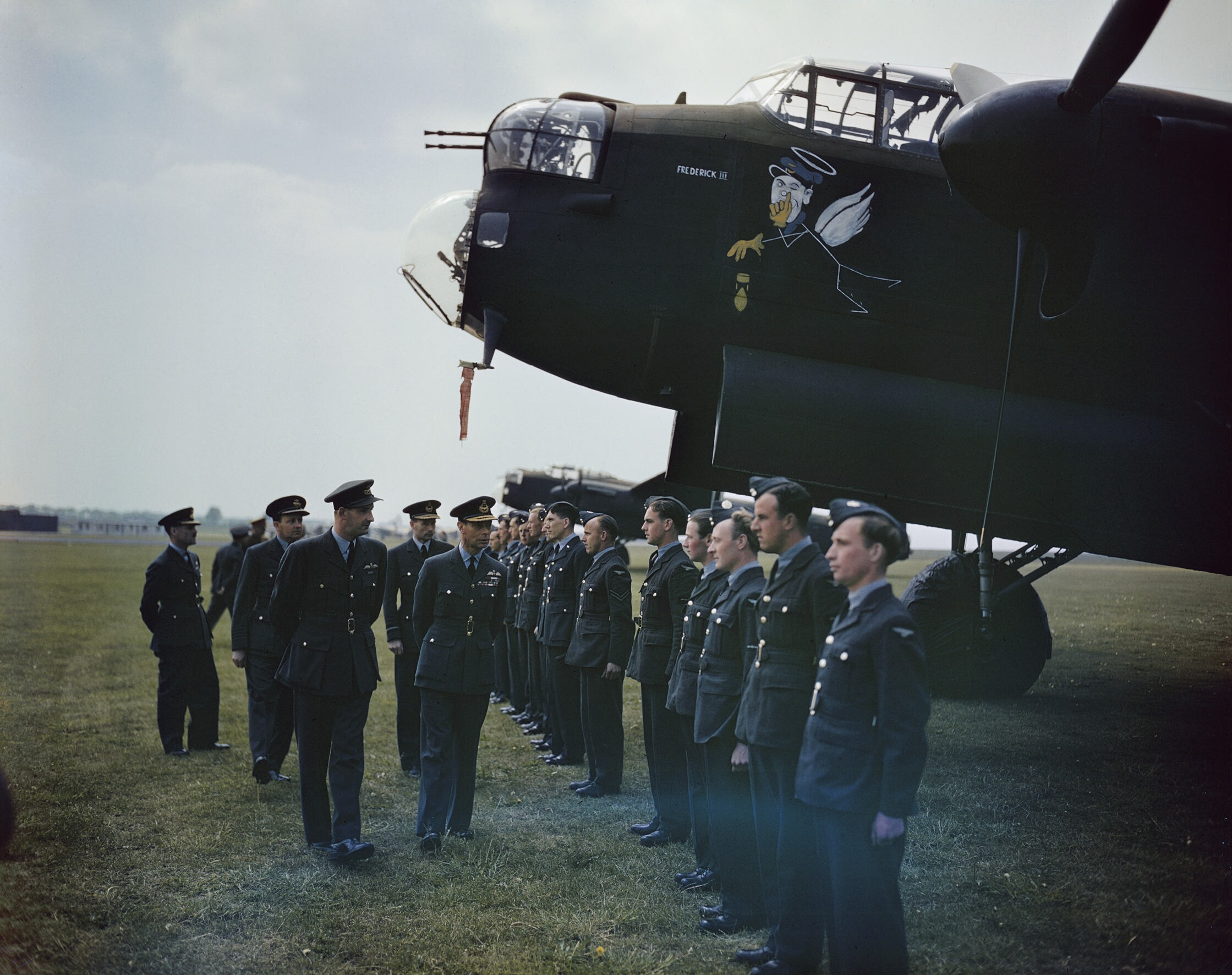
George VI visiting No. 617 Squadron in 1943

During the Second World War, Tees joined the Royal Air Force in 1941 with the service number 1332270. Tees was posted to No. 207 Squadron on 12 November 1942, before transferring to No. 617 Squadron on 6 April 1943. This squadron was created specifically to attack the Möhne and Edersee Dams using a specially developed "bouncing bomb" which was invented and developed by Barnes Wallis.

Tees took part in Operation Chastise, the famous "Dam Busters" raid on 16–17 May 1943. Sergeant Tees, who was 20 years old at the time of the raid, was the rear gunner in Lancaster AJ-C, piloted by Pilot Officer Warner Ottley, in the third and final wave of aircraft from No. 617 Squadron to leave from RAF Scampton. AJ-C never made it to its target and was shot down near Hamm. Tees should have been the nose gunner but had changed places with Sergeant Harry Strange in the rear turret. Had he not done so Tees would have been killed as the aircraft was picked out by enemy spotlights and hit with antiaircraft fire Tees later recalled that as the aircraft began to rapidly descend, Pilot Officer Ottley said over the intercom "I'm sorry boys, they got us". The aircraft then crashed.

Tees managed to escape from the rear turret and was found unconscious and badly burnt on the ground and was taken prisoner of war. He was the sole survivor from the crew of seven. He required extensive treatment and was imprisoned at Heydekruge POW Camp L6 for most of the war.

== Later life ==
In 1967 he took part in the Dam Busters reunion held on the 24th anniversary of the raid at Scampton in Lincolnshire.

Later in life Tees lived at 12 Wilbury Hills Road Caravan Site and ran a gentlemen's barber shop in Station Road in Letchworth, Hertfordshire.
