= George Grimson =

George Grimson Mentioned in dispatches
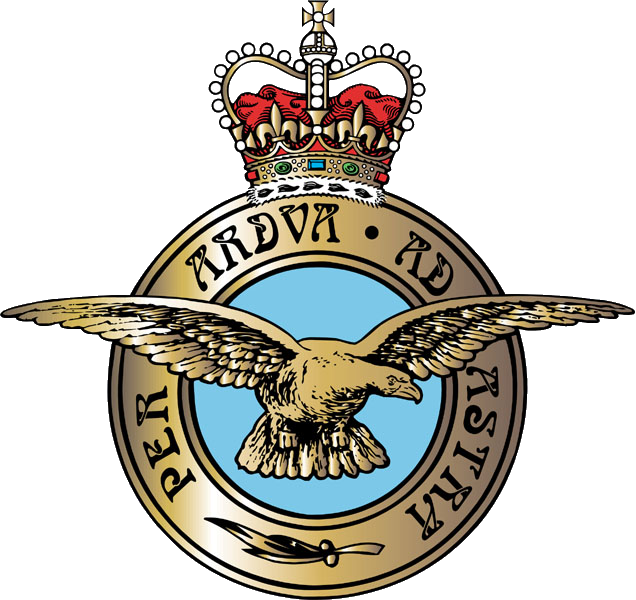
- Born: George John William Grimson; October 1915; Putney, London, England
- Died: 14 April 1944 (aged 28); Danzig, German-occupied Poland
- Burial place: Unknown; Memorial, Runnymede Panel 213
- Military career
- Allegiance: United Kingdom
- Branch: Royal Air Force
- Service years: 1938–1945
- Rank: Warrant Officer
- Service number: 631689
- Unit: No. 37 Squadron RAF

George Grimson (October 1915 - 14 April 1944) was a bomber crewman serving in RAF Bomber Command during the Second World War. He was shot down, captured and subsequently imprisoned in a succession of prisoner of war camps in Germany before escaping and forming a network which assisted fellow escapers. Grimson remained on the run in the Third Reich, hunted by the Gestapo, but eventually disappeared probably having been captured and murdered by the SS in or after mid-April 1944 in the Danzig area.

== Early life ==
Grimson was born in Putney, south-west London in October 1915, the son of plumber William John Grimson and his wife Rebecca. The family lived in Bendemeer Road in Putney until 1930 when they moved to Gladwyn Road. He had two older brothers William John and Frederick, a sister Lilian and a younger brother Walter. Grimson abandoned his architectural studies to join the RAF in early 1938, in order to help support his mother and siblings after their father died in 1937.

== Royal Air Force service ==
Grimson trained at RAF Uxbridge and trained as aircrew to fly as a wireless operator/air gunner. After completing training he was posted to No. 37 Squadron RAF and commenced flying operational sorties in Vickers Wellington bombers at the outbreak of war.

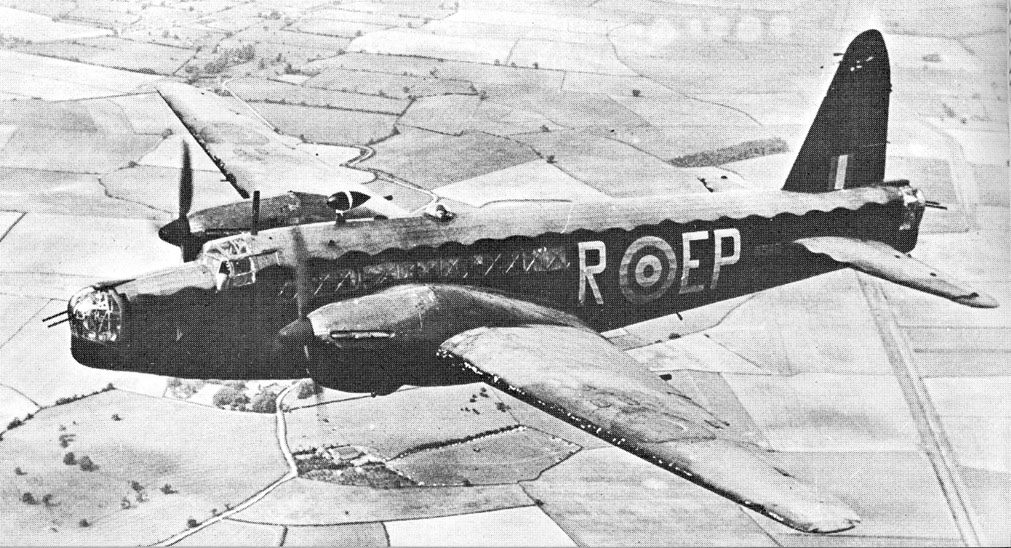
The Merlin-engined Wellington Mark II. This aircraft belongs to No. 104 Sqn.

=== Prisoner of War ===
George Grimson was the wireless operator aboard a No. 37 Squadron RAF Vickers Wellington (serial number "L7792") squadron codes "LF-L" which was shot down by anti-aircraft flak on 15 July 1940 during a raid on barges in the dockyards of the German port of Hamburg by the anti-aircraft defences over Bremen. He was one of only two survivors who baled out before the bomber exploded.

Allocated prisoner of war number 134, Grimson passed through Luftwaffe interrogation centre Dulag Luft, before being sent to Stalag Luft I at Barth, Stalag VIIIb, Lamsdorf and back to Barth before finally being sent to Stalag Luft III.

=== Escaper ===
At Barth, Grimson escaped with a number of other prisoners while being used to bring the harvest in. Unlike his later more sophisticated escapes Grimson simply kicked his German guard in the backside and ran, but he was quickly recaptured. He started to learn to speak German and collate information which would aid his next attempt. Grimson began to work on relationships with any Germans who he felt might be able to supply something which could help him. Grimson assisted with another escape from Stalag Luft I Barth in which he dressed as a German guard to assist another prisoner, Tubby Dixon, to escape by digging a drainage trench under the wire. The attempt failed when a real guard was waiting outside the wire to recapture him.

In September 1942 Grimson made his first solo escape attempt when he noticed that the German in charge of the stores where he helped out, looked very similar to himself. Grimson stole the German corporal's pay book and camp pass and smuggled them into the camp for the prisoner's forgery department to quickly copy them so he could get them replaced before the soldier noticed. A copy of a German fatigue uniform was made for him with German badges, a leather belt and a pistol holder made from cardboard stained brown with boot polish. An RAF cap was adjusted to resemble the German version to complete the disguise. Dressed up he walked to the camp gate where the sentry opened the gate hardly looking at his papers and let him through reaching the outer gate the guard took a quick look at the papers and let him pass through. Grimson's pass would not let him out of the main gate until darkness so he hid for 6 hours and escaped through the gate by the officer's mess and into the woods where he changed into his civilian outfit and made straight for the railway station. His papers passed scrutiny and he then purchased a ticket to a point on his journey to the Swiss border. His papers were checked at the next stop and he was arrested and returned to prison camp.

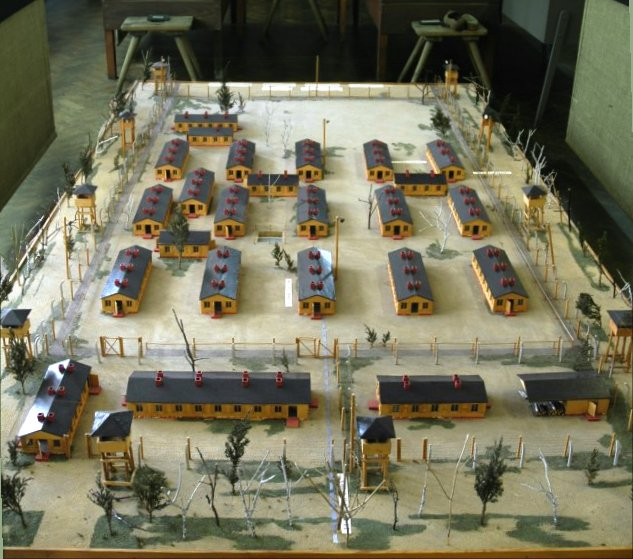
Model of Stalag Luft III prison camp.

In late December 1942, Grimson and Allan Morris walked out of the camp with a group of German servicemen but were recaptured 2 days later, when they showed more courtesy than was expected from a German Officer. The prisoner forgery department had produced the documents necessary for the escape and the German uniforms to go over their civilian clothing. Both Grimson and Morris had again noticed that they had near doubles serving as officers in the German guard company who they impersonated and both had lain in wait for 3 nights fully disguised in their German uniforms waiting for the right moment when the two clones attended the show. Outside the wire they changed into civilian clothes disguised as foreign workers, walking to Sagan station and catching a train to the outskirts of Leipzig before being caught.

In the late Spring of 1943 he made another attempt which was foiled before hatching a scheme to dress up as a guard with a fake rifle and march four prisoners out of the camp. Later he escaped again as the prisoners were being moved to Stalag Luft VI and was seen aboard the same train as the other prisoners; however, he was travelling in comfort impersonating a Gestapo agent. His plan was based on the confusion he had seen in the move to Heydekrug during which he had impersonated a German "ferret" (security search soldier). Wearing German overalls and leather belt pretending to test the boundary lighting, with a large ammeter fashioned from tins and dangling leads. Whilst the prisoners were preparing to transfer he stole a ladder setting it at a point 10 feet from a guard machine gun tower, calling up to the guard in fluent German he stepped over the warning wire and used his ladder to climb up to the lights, placing a plank across the two barbed wire fence lines. He tested a few bulbs, shouting to the guard each time he had to move. Twice Grimson was questioned by patrolling guards but each time he convinced them he was looking for a broken wire. 30 minutes later he dropped some pliers just inside the outer wire and told the guards that he was going to get them and return via the gate. He slowly lowered himself down, cracked a joke with the guard and retrieved his pliers. He walked calmly down the line until slipping into the woods where he changed into his civilian outfit and made off to the railway station. Grimson changed trains and was making his way towards the Baltic to Stettin in the hope of stowing away on a ship. On his fifth day of freedom, he was arrested as he tried to board a Swedish ship.

As a prisoner in Stalag Luft VI he was involved in the Tally-Ho network, whose acquisition of German uniforms, passes and ration cards from suborned guards enabled Grimson to escape from the camp in February 1944 dressed as a German soldier.

Arriving in Danzig (Gdańsk) he renewed contact with the Polish underground and organised a courier system using Germans on the Tally-Ho payroll. He travelled extensively through north-eastern Germany maintaining contact with the camp and even on occasion returning to its vicinity. Later Grimson secured employment as a boatman in Danzig harbour in which job he was able to pass escapees onto Swedish vessels. He assisted two of his fellow RAF NCOs to escape to England via the underground escape route that he established.

Harold Bennett quotes in his Official RAF liberation questionnaire that he was "a member of the Tally-ho club in Sagan and Heydekrug and helped to gather information and escape kit together. Spoke German. Participated in the escapes of W/O Grimson, Flockhart, Gilbert, Townsend-Coles, etc. from Stalag Luft 6 – Heydekrug. Last heard of Grimson in Danzig where he was waiting to help Leaman to get through. Source of information not reliable".

=== Disappearance ===
Grimson was supported by anti-Nazi Germans, forced labourers from German-occupied countries and a network of informants but was constantly hunted by the Gestapo agents of SS-Obersturmbannführer Dr. Günther Venediger, a price was placed on his head and wanted posters printed. He was last seen on 14 April 1944 in the Danzig area and was probably seized by the Gestapo, disappearing in captivity.

Oakleaf on ribbon of War Medal 1939–1945

== Awards ==
Grimson was Mentioned in Despatches posthumously in December 1947 for bravery during his escaping attempts and for his work to assist fellow escapers. There is a dedication on the forces war records dedication wall.

== Bibliography ==
- Barris, Ted (2014). The Great Escape. Dundurn Publishing. ISBN 978-1459728448.
- Carroll, Tim (2005). The Great Escape from Stalag Luft III. Pocket Publishing. ISBN 1416505318.
- Chorley, William R. (1992). RAF Bomber Command Losses, Volume 1. Midland Counties. ISBN 0-904597-87-3.
- Clark, Albert (2005). 33 Months as a POW in Stalag Luft III: A World War II Airman Tells His Story. Fulcrum Pub. ISBN 978-1-55591-536-0.
- Clutton-Brock, Oliver (2003). Footprints on the Sands of Time. Grub Street Publishing. ISBN 978-1904010357.
- Cooper, Alan W. (1988). Free To Fight Again. William Kimber. ISBN 0718306783.
- Dominy, John (1974). The Sergeant Escapers. Ian Allan. ISBN 0711005699.
- Durand, Arthur A. (1989). Stalag Luft III: The Secret Story. Patrick Stephens Limited. ISBN 978-1-85260-248-2.
- Feast, Sean (2015). The Last of the 39-ers. Grub Street. ISBN 978-1909166158.
- Read, Simon (2012). Human Game. Constable. ISBN 978-1-4721-1262-0.
- Vance, Jonathan F. (2000). A Gallant Company. Pacifica Military. ISBN 978-0-935-55347-5.
