= Macikai =

Coordinates: 55.356°N 21.520°E

Location in Lithuania

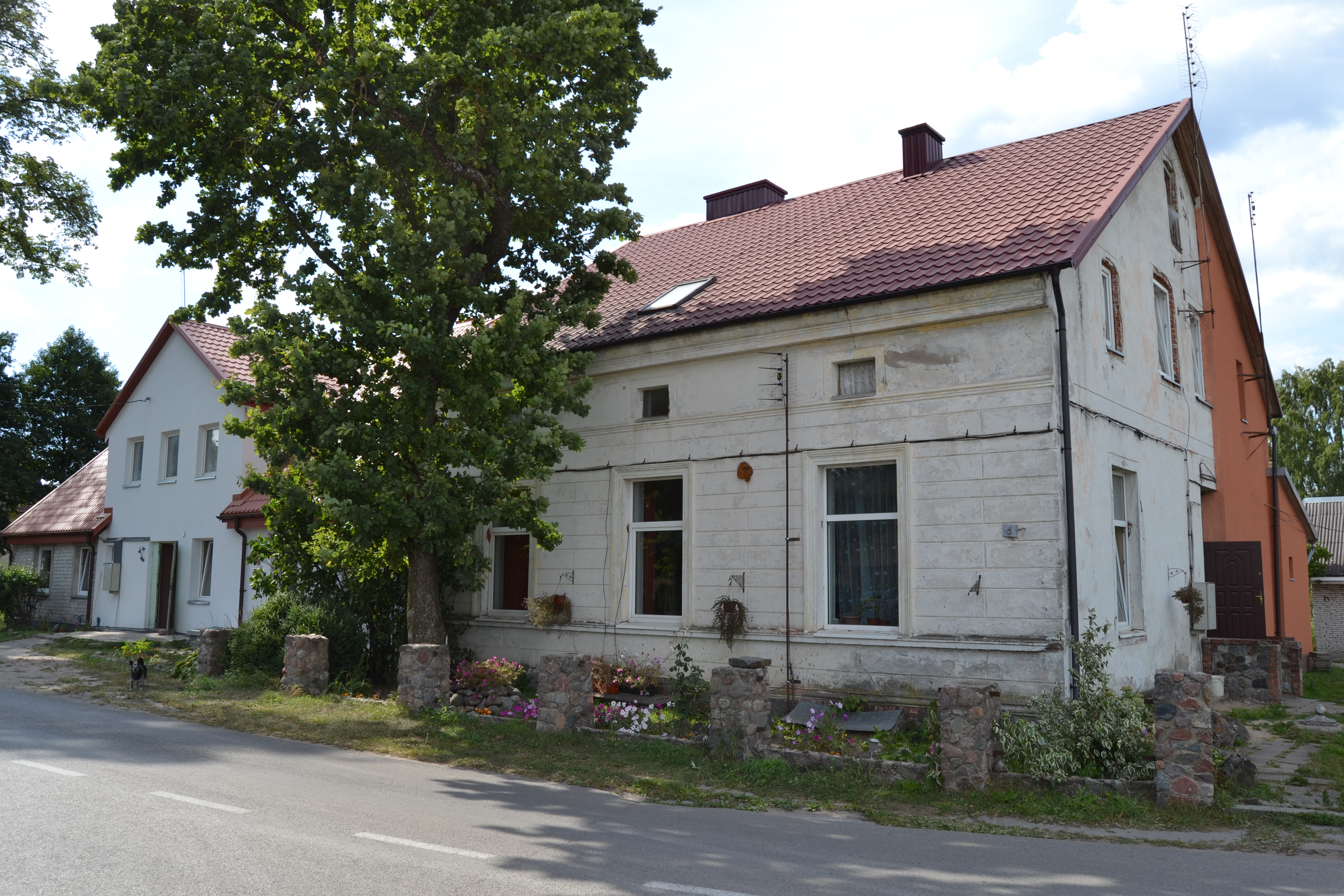
Macikai Manor

Macikai is a village in Šilutė District Municipality, Lithuania, 2 km east of Šilute. The village is within the Lithuanian Coastal Lowlands. The Šyša river flows around Macikai along its northwestern and northeastern edges.

== History ==
Early metntions about Macikai are dated by the 16th century. In 17th century, the Macikai Manor was established on the left bank of Šyša.

When in Province of Prussia, the village name was Matzicken.

During 1939–1955 there were German and Soviet Macikai POW and GULAG Camps by the village.

== Notable people ==
- Hermann Sudermann (1857 – 1928), Mennonite writer was born and lived for some time in Matzicken, in the outbuilding of the Macikai Manor.
- Vytautas Kamantas (1930 - 2012), Lithuanian diaspora activist was born in Macikai.
