= Morzyczyn, West Pomeranian Voivodeship =

Morzyczyn
- Village
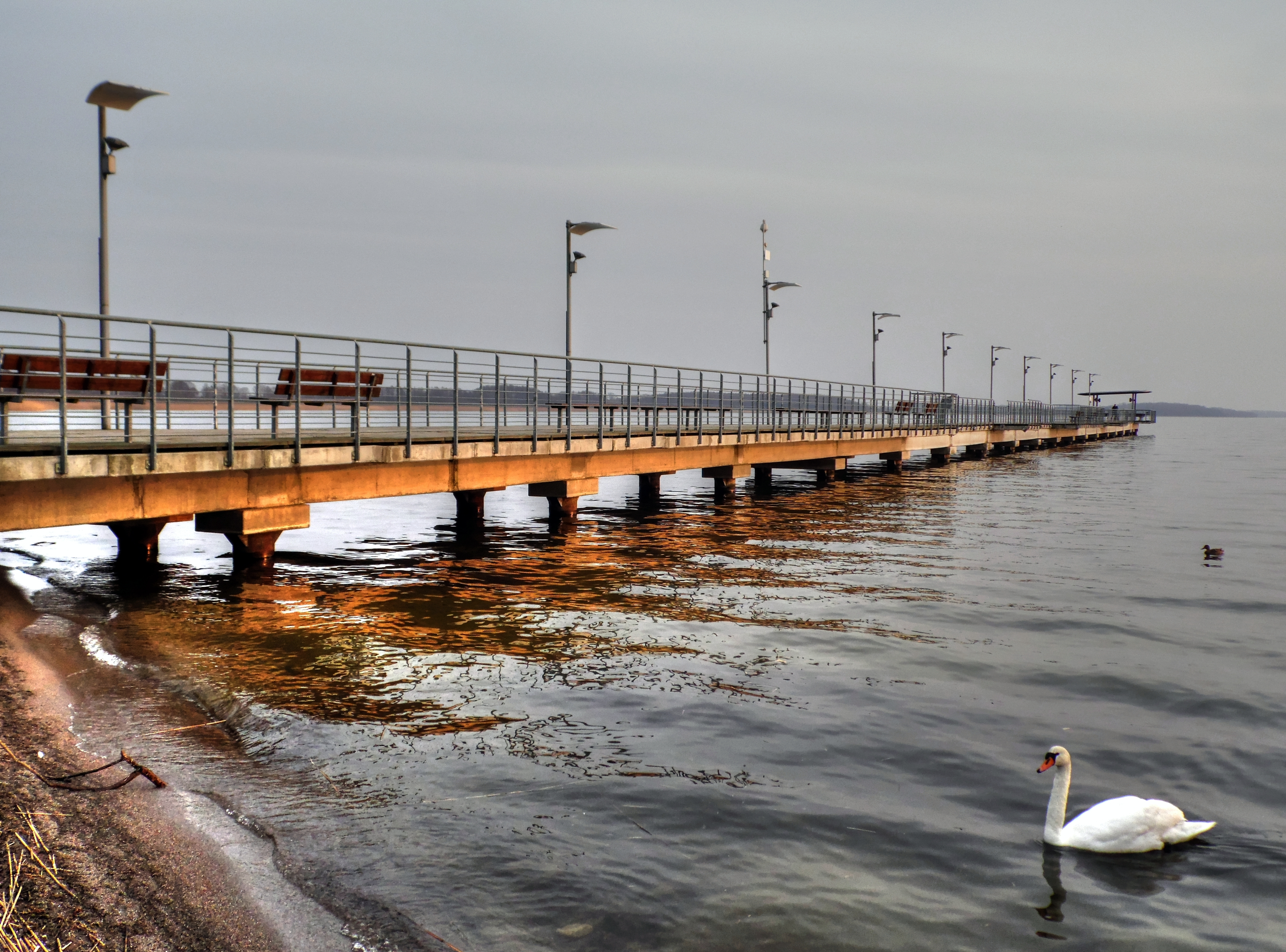
- Pier of Miedwie Lake in Morzyczyn

- Location within Poland
- Coordinates: 53°21′9″N 14°55′18″E
- Country: Poland
- Voivodeship: West Pomeranian
- County: Stargard
- Gmina: Kobylanka
- Population: 859
- Time zone: UTC+1 (CET)
  - Summer (DST): UTC+2 (CEST)
- Vehicle registration: ZST

Morzyczyn [mɔˈʐɨt͡ʂɨn] (German: Moritzfelde) is a village in the administrative district of Gmina Kobylanka, within Stargard County, West Pomeranian Voivodeship, in north-western Poland. It lies approximately 8 km (5 mi) west of Stargard and 24 km (15 mi) east of the regional capital Szczecin. It is situated on the northern shore of Miedwie Lake in the historic region of Pomerania.

The village has a population of 859.

== History ==
The territory became part of the emerging Polish state under its first ruler Mieszko I around 967. Following the fragmentation of Poland, it formed part of the Duchy of Pomerania until 1637.

During World War II, in May 1943, the Germans established the Stalag Luft 7 prisoner-of-war camp for Allied POWs in the village. In 1944, it was relocated to Bąków. Following Germany's defeat in the war, the territory became again part of Poland.
