= Erik Stohn =

German politician (born 1983)

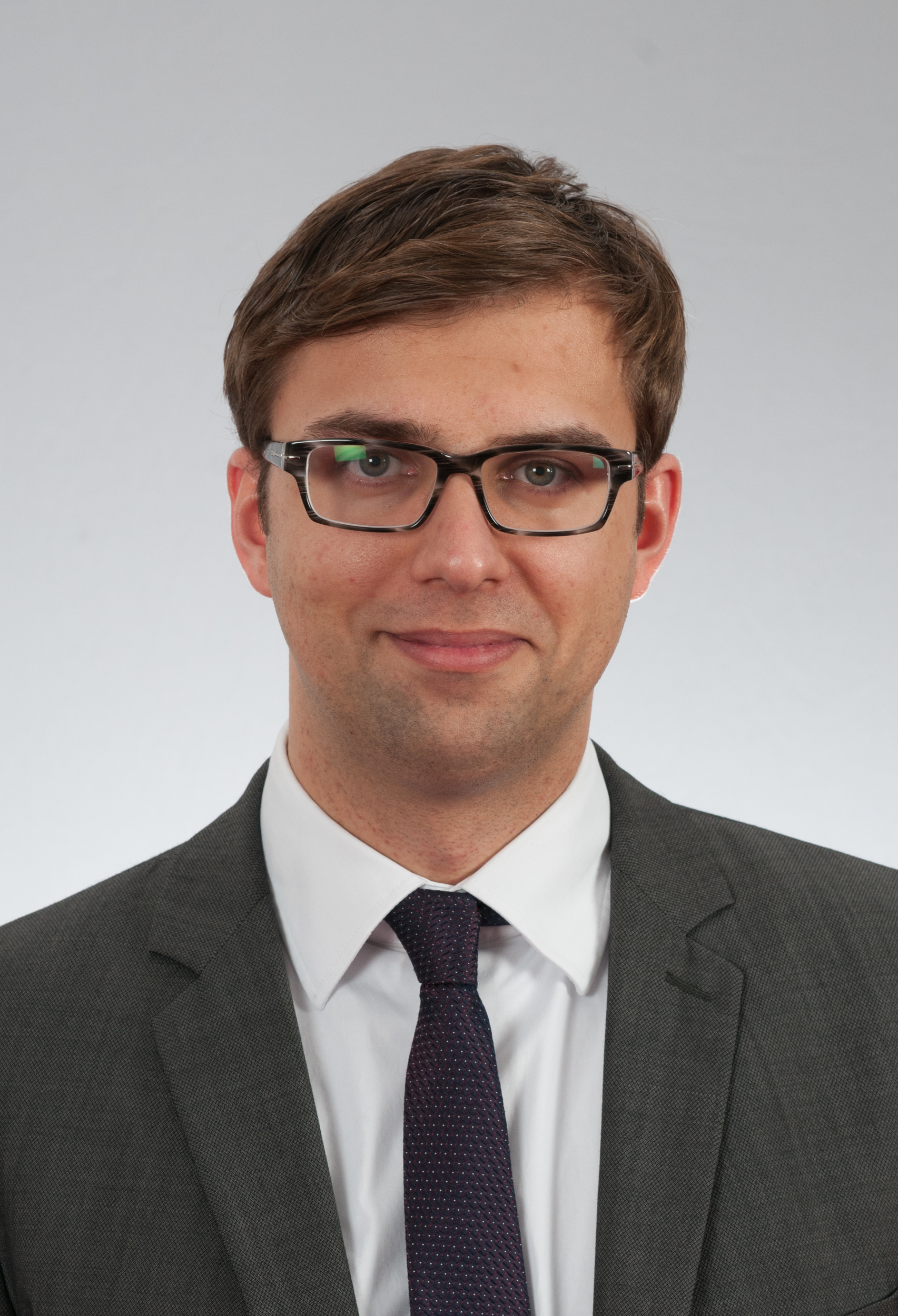
- Stohn in 2016

Member of the Landtag of Brandenburg
- Incumbent
- Assumed office 8 October 2014
- Preceded by: Kornelia Wehlan
- Constituency: Teltow-Fläming II

Personal details
- Born: 20 December 1983 (age 42)
- Party: Social Democratic Party (since 2001)

Erik Stohn (born 20 December 1983) is a German politician serving as a member of the Landtag of Brandenburg since 2014. From 2019 to 2021, he served as group leader of the Social Democratic Party.
