= Stalag Luft IV =

German POW camp during World War II

- Groß Tychow (Tychowo), Pomerania
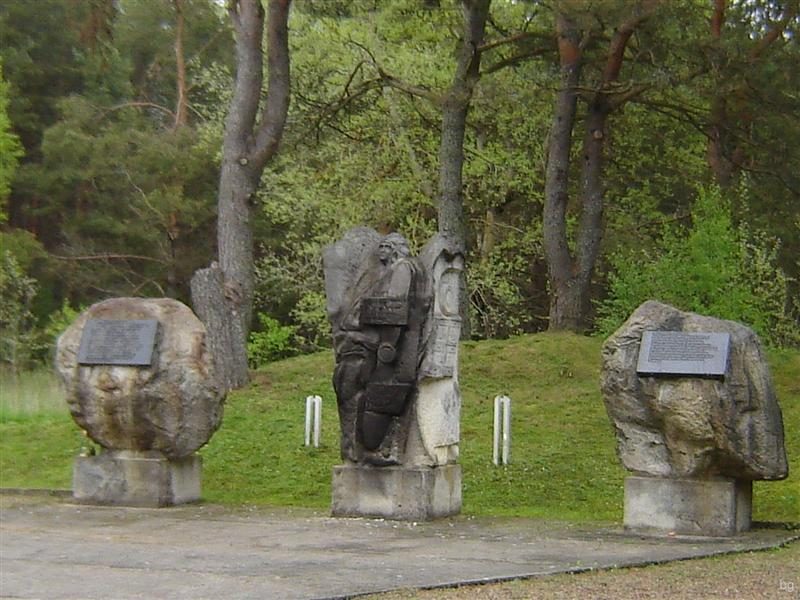
- Stalag Luft IV monument

Site information
- Type: Prisoner-of-war camp
- Controlled by: Nazi Germany

Location
- Groß Tychow, Germany (pre-war borders, 1937) Stalag Luft IV (Poland)
- Coordinates: 53.9425°N 16.1761°E

Site history
- In use: 1944–1945
- Battles/wars: World War II

Garrison information
- Occupants: mainly American Air Force NCOs, and also British, Canadian, Polish, Australian, New Zealand and other Allied POWs

Stalag Luft IV was a German World War II prisoner-of-war camp in Gross Tychow, Pomerania (now Tychowo, Poland). It housed mostly American POWs, but also Britons, Canadians, Poles, Australians, New Zealanders, South Africans, Czechs, Frenchmen and a Norwegian.

== Camp history ==
The camp was opened in May 1944. In July of that year a military report was released which described such problems as inadequate shower facilities, unfit distribution of Red Cross parcels, and that prisoners complained about the food situation often. Two letters and four postcards were permitted per month. These letters were harshly censored, with prisoners forced to tell families that they were being treated well and that there were no problems whatsoever.

A report by the International Red Cross in October 1944 described camp conditions as generally bad. The camp was divided into five compounds (A-E) separated by barbed wire fences, with the POWs housed in 40 wooden barrack huts, each containing 200 men. Prisoners in compounds A and B had triple-tiered bunks, but there were no bunks at all in compounds C and D, and POWs slept on the floor. None of the huts were heated, with only five small iron stoves in the whole camp. Latrines were open-air, and there were no proper washing facilities. Medical facilities and supplies of food and clothing were also inadequate. At this point there were 7,089 American and 886 British POWs (of these 606 were from the British Isles, and included 147 Canadians, 37 Australians, 58 Poles, 22 New Zealanders, 8 South Africans, 5 Czechs, 2 French and 1 Norwegian).

Another International Red Cross inspection in January 1945, reported that the camp held:

- 8,033 Americans
- 820 British
- 60 Polish
- 5 Czech
- 2 French
- 1 Norwegian

=== The Death March ===
On 6 February 1945, some 8,000 men of the camp set out on a march that would be called the "Death March". The prisoners were given remaining Red Cross parcels and were allowed to carry as much as they could. The march from Gross Tychow lasted approximately 86 days. They were forced to march under guard about 15–20 miles (24–32 km) per day. There was much zigzagging, to escape the encroaching Soviet Red Army from the east. The death march passed through the towns of Białogard and Świnoujście.

The treatment was deplorable. The sick were shot or bayoneted when they fell out of formation. Dysentery and diarrhea were commonplace as water sources and latrines were inadvertently mixed. Shelter might be a barn or under the stars, in the rain, snow, or whatever was available. Food remained scarce and the best one could hope for was a portion to replenish the calories from a full day’s march (a bushel or two of steamed potatoes for a barn full of men was the best ever received at the end of a day). Often, the food was placed in the barn in the dark of night for the men to get what they could. The German government provided no clothing. They carried two blankets, and an overcoat for bedding.

The average POW lost a third of his body weight after capture. They drank water, often contaminated, from ditches beside the road, or ate snow when available. They used cigarettes, watches, rings or whatever they had to trade with the farmers along the way, for food. However, in doing so risking the farmers and the POWs' lives. The POWs ate charcoal to help stop dysentery, and they all became infested with lice. Pneumonia, diphtheria, pellagra, typhus, trench foot, tuberculosis and other diseases ran rampant among the POWs.

Acts of heroism were virtually universal. The stronger helped the weaker. Those fortunate enough to have a coat shared it with others. The Germans sometimes provided a wagon for the sick. However, there seldom were horses available, so teams of POWs pulled the wagons through the snow. When a wagon was not available and a POW fell out along the road, a German guard would drop back and a shot would be heard. The guard would then come back into formation alone. However, not all Germans were hated - the guard Shorty was carried by several prisoners after he couldn't go on.

They reached (Stalag XI-A), near Dörnitz on 30 March 1945. Many camps on the eastern edge of Germany were combined into one large camp there. The treatment was a repetition of that at previous camps, with the exception of food, of which there was virtually none. There were no beds or bedding in the buildings. The prisoners, and the Germans as well, knew liberation was close at hand. The sounds of the encroaching American artillery could be heard getting louder and louder at this camp. When the sound of Allied artillery grew closer, the German guards were less harsh in their treatment of POWs, because the prisoner roles might soon be reversed.

The POWs were only in this camp for about a week, when lagers A and B from Stalag Luft IV were taken out on their final march on 8 April 1945, this time marching to the east. This last march lasted 25 days, but was just as harsh as the previous march except for the treatment by the Germans, which was somewhat better. There was still little or no food available, and the pace was much slower, advancing 4–5 miles a day. With the Russian and Western Allied forces closing in rapidly, the POWs of Stalag Luft IV crossed the River Elbe on 21 April 1945, near Dahlenburg. On the morning of 2 May 1945 the POWs were all sitting in a ditch next to the River Elbe near Lauenburg, Germany, when the British arrived and liberated the camp. Soldiers were given virtually nothing and told to march west. Thus Stalag Luft IV ended.

Some POWs managed to escape before the liberation of the rest of the camp. According to an interview with Sgt. James B. Lindsay 15081658, he and two fellow POWs, Dewitt and Lockenny, armed with a hatchet taken from a woodpile of a nearby barn, captured a guard and fled on 24 April 1945; they found the body of a second decapitated German officer while making their escape. Two days later they reached an American outpost while heading South towards Düben.

== See also ==
- List of prisoner-of-war camps in Germany
