= Józef Warszawski =

Polish philosopher (1903–1997)

Józef Warszawski (1903—1997) was a Polish philosopher.

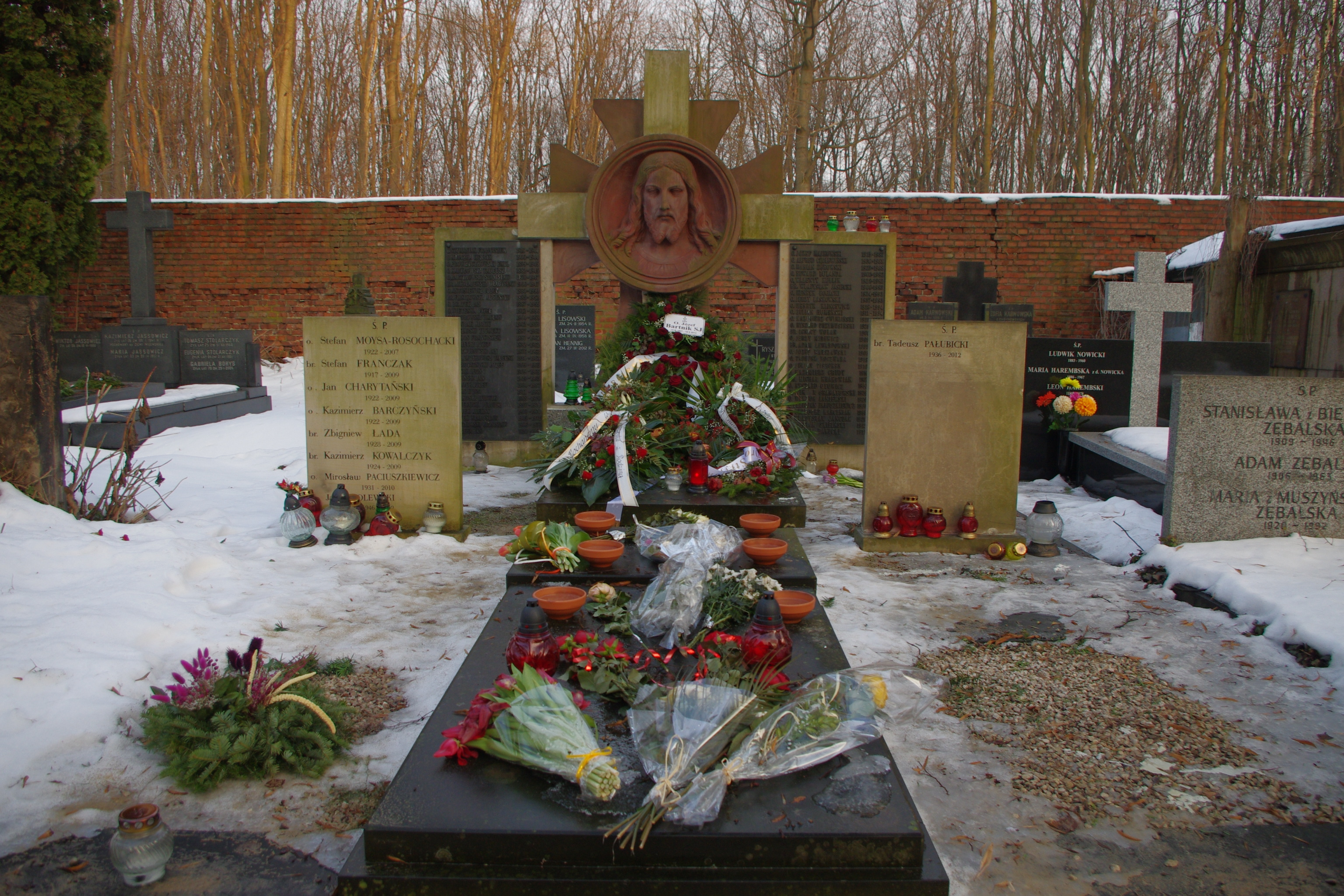
Gravesite of Warszawski
