= Teichert =

Teichert is a surname. Notable people with the surname include:

== People with the name ==
- Curt Teichert (1905–1996), German-American palaeontologist and geologist
- E. John Teichert, Brig. Gen., Assistant Deputy Under Secretary of the U.S. Air Force
- Max-Martin Teichert, (1915-1943), German U-boat commander in World War II
- Minerva Teichert (1888–1976), American painter
- Nancy Weaver Teichert, A graduate of the Indiana University
- Thorsten Teichert (born 1963 in Berlin), German economist
