= Gresse =

- Municipality
- Location of Gresse within Ludwigslust-Parchim district
- Interactive map of Gresse
- Location within Germany Location within Mecklenburg-Vorpommern
- Coordinates: 53°25′N 10°45′E
- Country: Germany
- State: Mecklenburg-Vorpommern
- District: Ludwigslust-Parchim
- Municipal assoc.: Boizenburg-Land

Government
  - Mayor: Werner Hornbacher

Area
  - Total: 21.25 km^{2} (8.20 sq mi)
- Elevation: 24 m (79 ft)

Population (2025-12-31)
  - Total: 646
  - Density: 30.4/km^{2} (78.7/sq mi)
- Time zone: UTC+01:00 (CET)
  - Summer (DST): UTC+02:00 (CEST)
- Postal codes: 19258
- Dialling codes: 038842
- Vehicle registration: LWL
- Website: www.amtboizenburgland.de

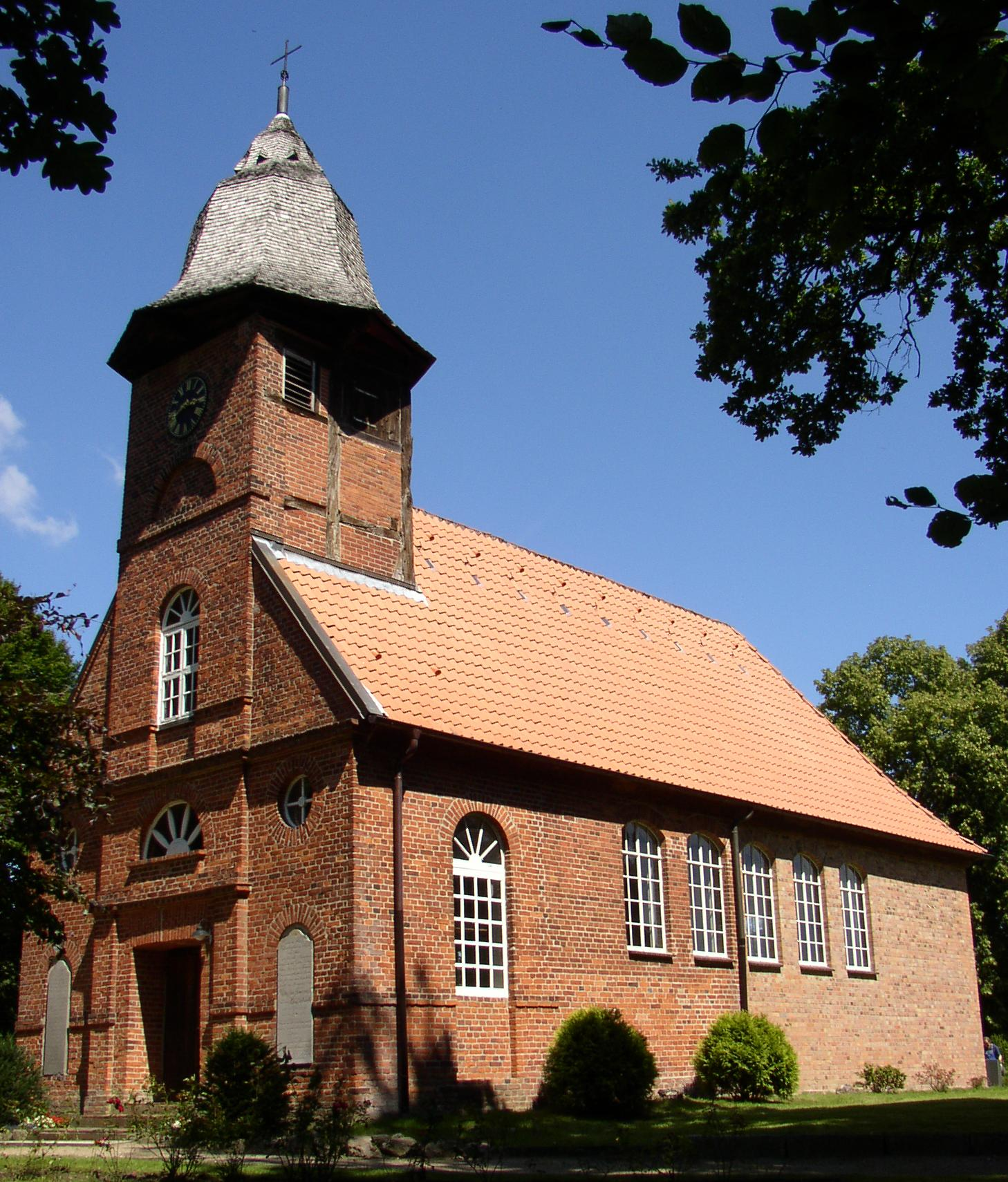
Church

Gresse is a municipality in the Ludwigslust-Parchim district, in Mecklenburg-Vorpommern, Germany. During World War II, one of the German death marches of Allied prisoners-of-war passed through the town. Sixty of the prisoners-of-war died at Gresse on 19 April 1945 in a "friendly fire" incident when strafed by a flight of Royal Air Force Hawker Typhoons which mistook them for retreating German soldiers.
