= Bernhard Kadenbach =

German biochemist (1933–2021)

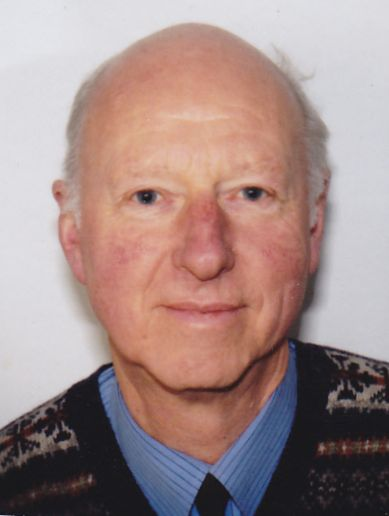
Bernhard Kadenbach (2004)

Bernhard Kadenbach (21 August 1933 – 14 April 2021) was a German biochemist with main research in structure and function of the mitochondrial cytochrome c oxidase, who worked as a professor in the chemistry department of Philipps-Universität Marburg.

== Life ==
=== Academic career ===
Kadenbach earned a "Diplom" (master's degree) in chemistry at the Humboldt-Universität zu Berlin in 1959. He spent one year (1960) as research fellow at the Wenner-Gren Institute of the Stockholm University. He obtained his PhD in biochemistry in 1964 at the Institute of Physiological Chemistry, Philipps-Universität Marburg. The dissertation was entitled "The influence of thyroidhormones in vivo on oxidative phosphorylation and enzyme activities in mitochondria". In 1964 he married Helke Mosner (two children). From 1968 to 1971 he was a teaching and research assistant at the Physiological Chemistry Institute of the Ludwig-Maximilians-Universität München. In 1971 he was qualified for lecturing at the Universität Konstanz (habilitation). The thesis was entitled: “Biosynthesis of cytochrome c”. From 1971–1973 he became "Oberassistent" (assistant professor) at the Laboratory of Biochemistry at the Eidgenössischen Technischen Hochschule Zürich, Switzerland. In 1973 he became a professor of biochemistry at the Fachbereich Chemie, Philipps-Universität Marburg. His formal retirement was in 1998. From 2003–2013 he continued his research on regulation of cytochrome c oxidase at the Biomedizinisches Forschungszentrum (BMFZ) within the Klinikum of the Philipps-Universität Marburg.

=== Fields of research ===
Kadenbach studied the mitochondrial phosphate carrier and found its essential requirement for cardiolipin.

Subsequent studies concentrated on the protein structure and function of the mitochondrial cytochrome c oxidase. He discovered the occurrence of tissue-specific and developmental-specific protein isoforms. Defective cytochrome c oxidase activity was found in mitochondrial diseases and in human muscle cells with increasing age. Ten specific binding sites for ADP or ATP were identified in mammalian cytochrome c oxidase, which regulate the H+/e- stoichiometry of proton pumping, and the allosteric inhibition of activity, depending on the ATP/ADP ratio. Stress-dependent reversible dephosphorylation of cytochrome c oxidase suggests formation of reactive oxygen species. A hypothesis on the cause of oxidative stress, aging and disease was published by Kadenbach in 2013.

=== Memberships ===
- Member of the Gesellschaft für Biochemie and Molekularbiologie since 1963
- Member of the New York Academy of Sciences since 1990

=== Publications ===
- 1959 (Diplom) Der Einfluß von Chlorpromazin auf die oxidative Phosphorylierung von Tumormitochondrien
- 1964 (Dissertation) Der Einfluß von Thyreoidhormonen in vivo auf die oxydative Phosphorylierung und Enzymaktivitäten in Mitochondrien
- 1970 (Habilitation) Die Biosynthese von Cytochrom-c

From 1959 until 2012 Kadenbach published 237 papers in national and international journals. The following publications are a selection:

- P. Merle and B. Kadenbach: The subunit composition of mammalian cytochrome c oxidase, Eur J Biochem 105, 499–507 (1980).
- B. Kadenbach and J. Müller-Höcker: Mutations of mitochondrial DNA and human death, Naturwissenschaften 77, 221–225 (1990).
- B. Kadenbach and S. Arnold: Minireview: A second mechanism of respiratory control, FEBS Lett. 447, 131–134 (1999).
- B. Kadenbach, R. Ramzan, L. Wen, and S. Vogt: New extension of the Mitchell Theory for oxidative phosphorylation in mitochondria of living organisms, Biochim. Biophys. Acta. 1800, 205–212 (2010).
- B. Kadenbach (ed.): Mitochondrial Oxidative Phosphorylation. Nuclear-Encodes Genes, Enzyme Regulation, and Pathophysiology (Advances in Medical Medicine and Biology 748), Springer-Verlag (2012) ISBN 9781461435723.

== Literature ==
- Kürschners Deutscher Gelehrten-Kalender online, Ref.-Nr. P34933
- Christian Reichardt and Dorothea Schulz: Kurze Übersicht über die Entwicklung des Fachs Chemie an der Philipps-Universität Marburg von 1609 bis zur Gegenwart, 4. verbesserte and ergänzte Auflage, Marburg (2012)
