= Luckenwalde =

- Town
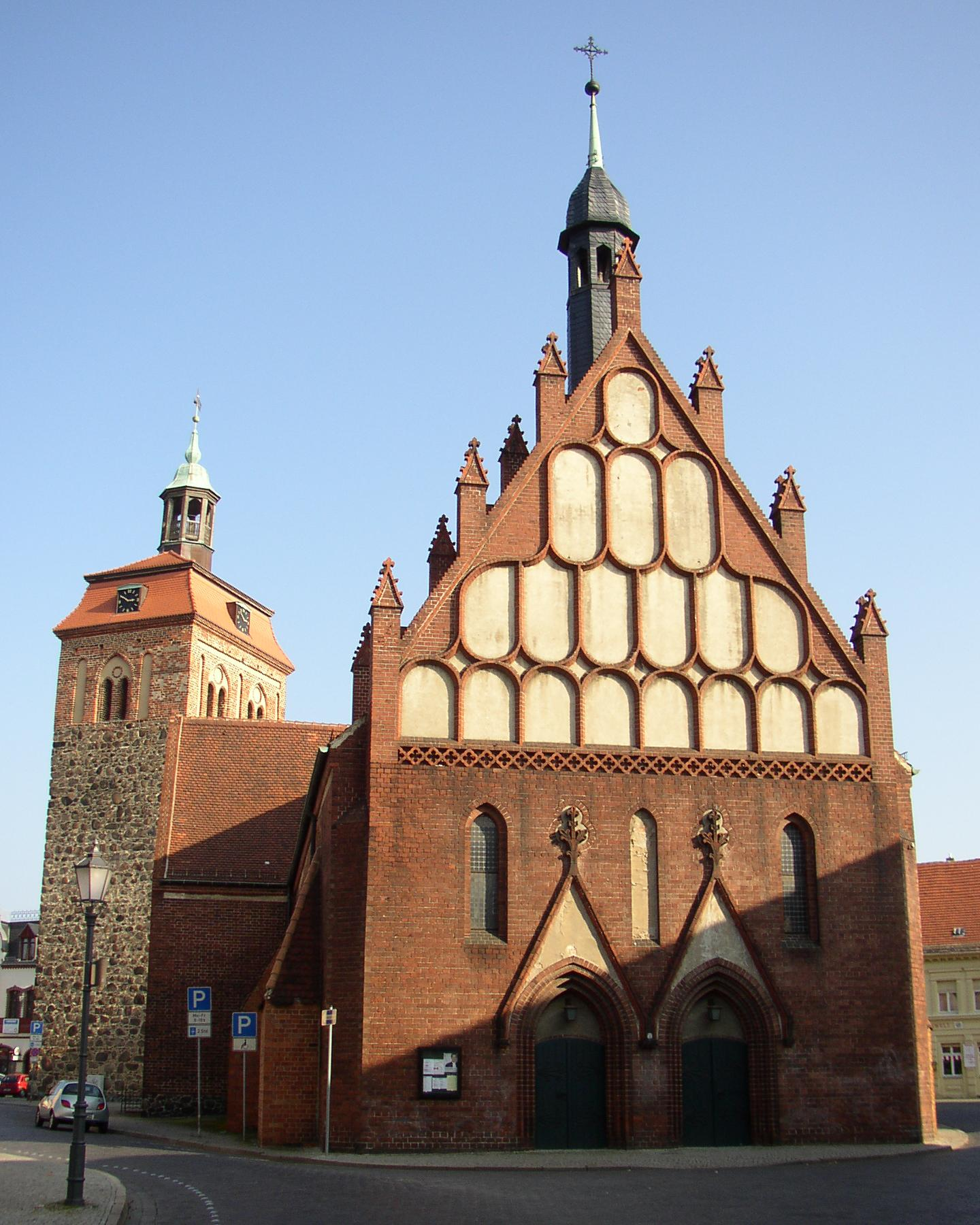
- Market tower and St. John's Church

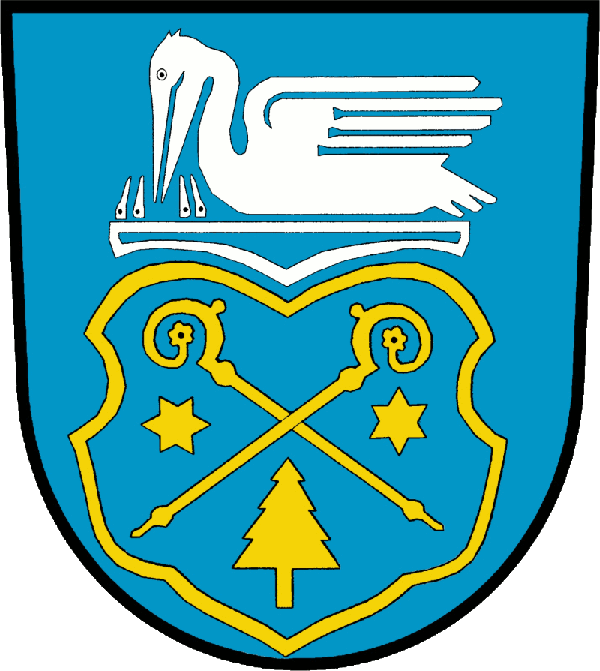
- Coat of arms

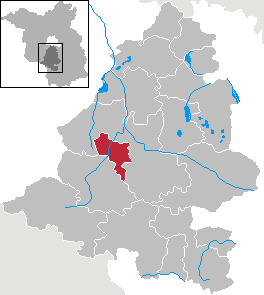
- Location of Luckenwalde within Teltow-Fläming district
- Interactive map of Luckenwalde
- Location within Germany Location within Brandenburg
- Coordinates: 52°05′N 13°10′E
- Country: Germany
- State: Brandenburg
- District: Teltow-Fläming
- Subdivisions: 3 Ortsteile

Government
  - Mayor (2026–33): Jochen Neumann (Ind.)

Area
  - Total: 46.61 km^{2} (18.00 sq mi)
- Elevation: 48 m (157 ft)

Population (2025-12-31)
  - Total: 21,077
  - Density: 452.2/km^{2} (1,171/sq mi)
- Time zone: UTC+01:00 (CET)
  - Summer (DST): UTC+02:00 (CEST)
- Postal codes: 14943
- Dialling codes: 03371
- Vehicle registration: TF
- Website: www.luckenwalde.de

Luckenwalde (German: [ˌlʊkn̩ˈvaldə]; Upper and Lower Sorbian: Łukowc, Upper Sorbian: [ˈwukɔfts], Lower Sorbian: [ˈwukɔwts]) is the capital of the Teltow-Fläming district in the state of Brandenburg in eastern Germany. It is situated on the Nuthe river north of the Fläming Heath, at the eastern rim of the Nuthe-Nieplitz Nature Park, about 50 km (31 mi) south of Berlin. The town area includes the villages of Frankenfelde and Kolzenburg.

== Overview ==
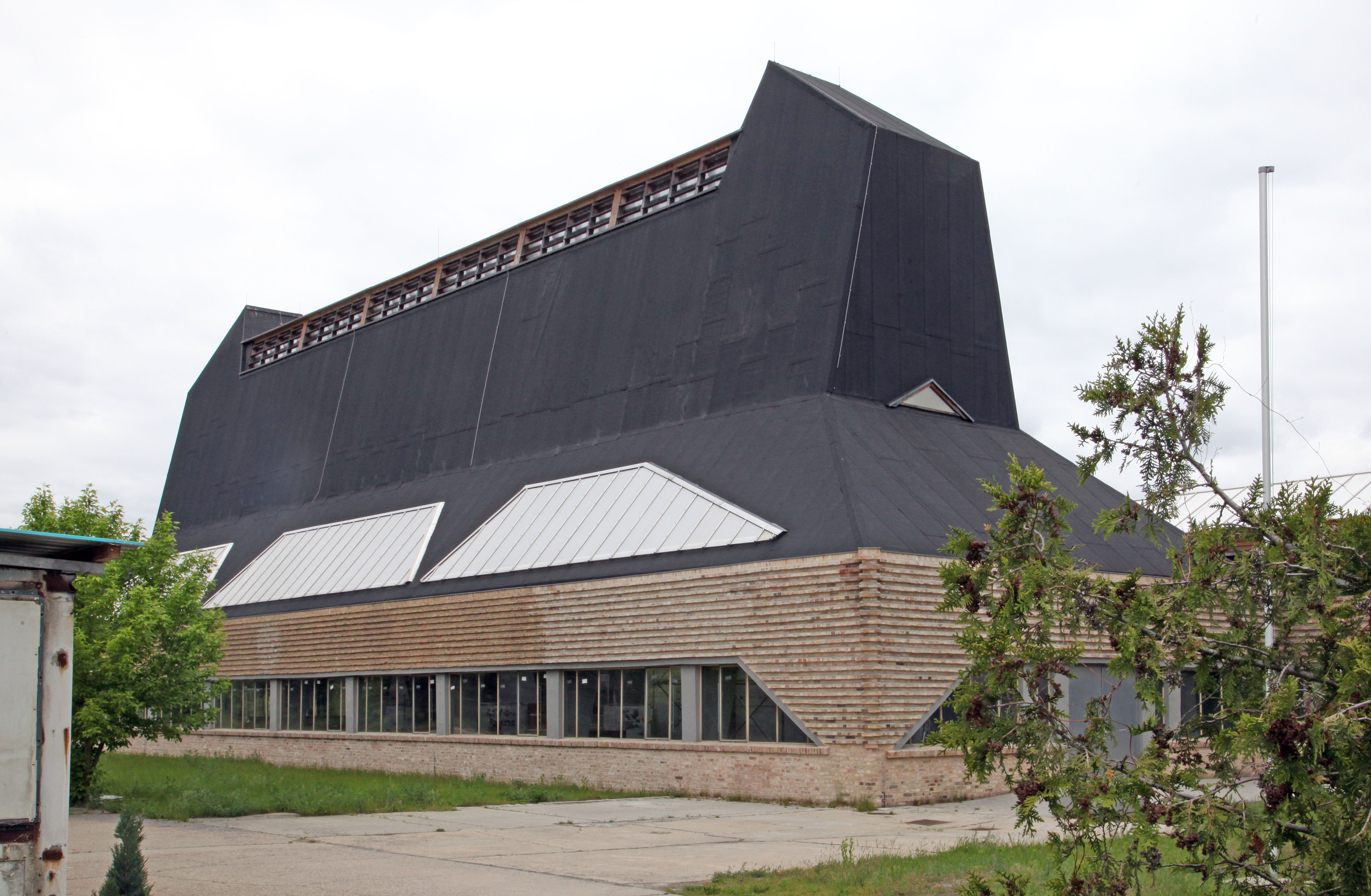
Former hat factory

The former Slavic settlement of Lugkin was conquered by Margrave Conrad Wettin of Meissen in the course of the 1147 Wendish Crusade. Lukenwalde Castle was first mentioned in a 1216 deed as a burgward of the Bishopric of Brandenburg, it was acquired by Zinna Abbey in 1285. Together with Zinna it remained under the rule of the Archbishopric of Magdeburg and its successor, the Prussian Duchy of Magdeburg until it was attached to the Margraviate of Brandenburg in 1773.

Originating in the 17th century, Luckenwalde's cloth and wool factories did not spring up until the reign of King Frederick II of Prussia and soon were among the most extensive in Germany. Other traditional industries were cotton printing and a dye works, brewing, and the making of metal and bronze goods. In 1808 Luckenwalde officially received town privileges.

By the turn of the 20th Century Luckenwalde became renowned as a key manufacturer of hats. In 1921 the two biggest hat ateliers, Herrmann and Steinberg, merged and set up their factory on an industrial estate in Luckenwalde. The factory was designed by German architect Erich Mendelsohn in 1923, the factory is considered a milestone of Expressionist architecture. The hat factory fell into disrepair during and after the war period and was restored in 2001, but as of 2013 the building remains empty.

During World War II, the Stalag III-A prisoner-of-war camp was located in Luckenwalde. In April 1941, the Stalag 333 POW camp was established, and then was relocated to Komorowo in German-occupied Poland in November 1941. There was also a work camp for civilians. The Nazis forced people to work for their war effort or else the families of people who worked there would perish. Lack of food and hard work killed thousands. Among them were Poles, Italians, French and many more. There were several places in the town and surrounding areas where they worked. Luckenwalde was taken by the Red Army on 22 April 1945.

== Demography ==
Development of Population since 1875 within the Current Boundaries (Blue Line: Population; Dotted Line: Comparison to Population Development of Brandenburg state; Grey Background: Time of Nazi rule; Red Background: Time of Communist rule)

Recent Population Development and Projections – Population Development before Census 2011 (blue line); Recent Population Development according to the Census in Germany in 2011 (blue bordered line); Official projections for 2005-2030 (yellow line); for 2017-2030 (scarlet line); for 2020-2030 (green line)

Luckenwalde: Population development
within the current boundaries (2020)

Year	Pop.	±% p.a.
1875	14,699	—
1890	19,173	+1.79%
1910	24,213	+1.17%
1925	25,625	+0.38%
1939	29,383	+0.98%
1950	31,668	+0.68%
1964	29,968	−0.39%

Year	Pop.	±% p.a.
1971	29,700	−0.13%
1981	27,957	−0.60%
1985	27,487	−0.42%
1990	26,544	−0.70%
1995	24,185	−1.84%
2000	22,389	−1.53%
2005	21,373	−0.92%

Year	Pop.	±% p.a.
2010	20,471	−0.86%
2015	20,358	−0.11%
2016	20,521	+0.80%
2017	20,674	+0.75%
2018	20,522	−0.74%
2019	20,582	+0.29%
2020	20,586	+0.02%

== Politics ==
Seats in the municipal assembly (Stadtverordnetenversammlung) as of 2024 elections:

- Gemeinsam für Luckenwalde (GfL): 7
- Social Democratic Party of Germany (SPD): 6
- Christian Democratic Union (CDU): 5
- The Left: 4
- Alliance 90/The Greens: 1
- Bauernverband (BV): 1
- Free Democratic Party (FDP): 1
- Die PARTEI: 1
- Teichert (Ind.): 1
- Luckenwalde Ökologisch Sozial (LÖS): 1

== Transport ==
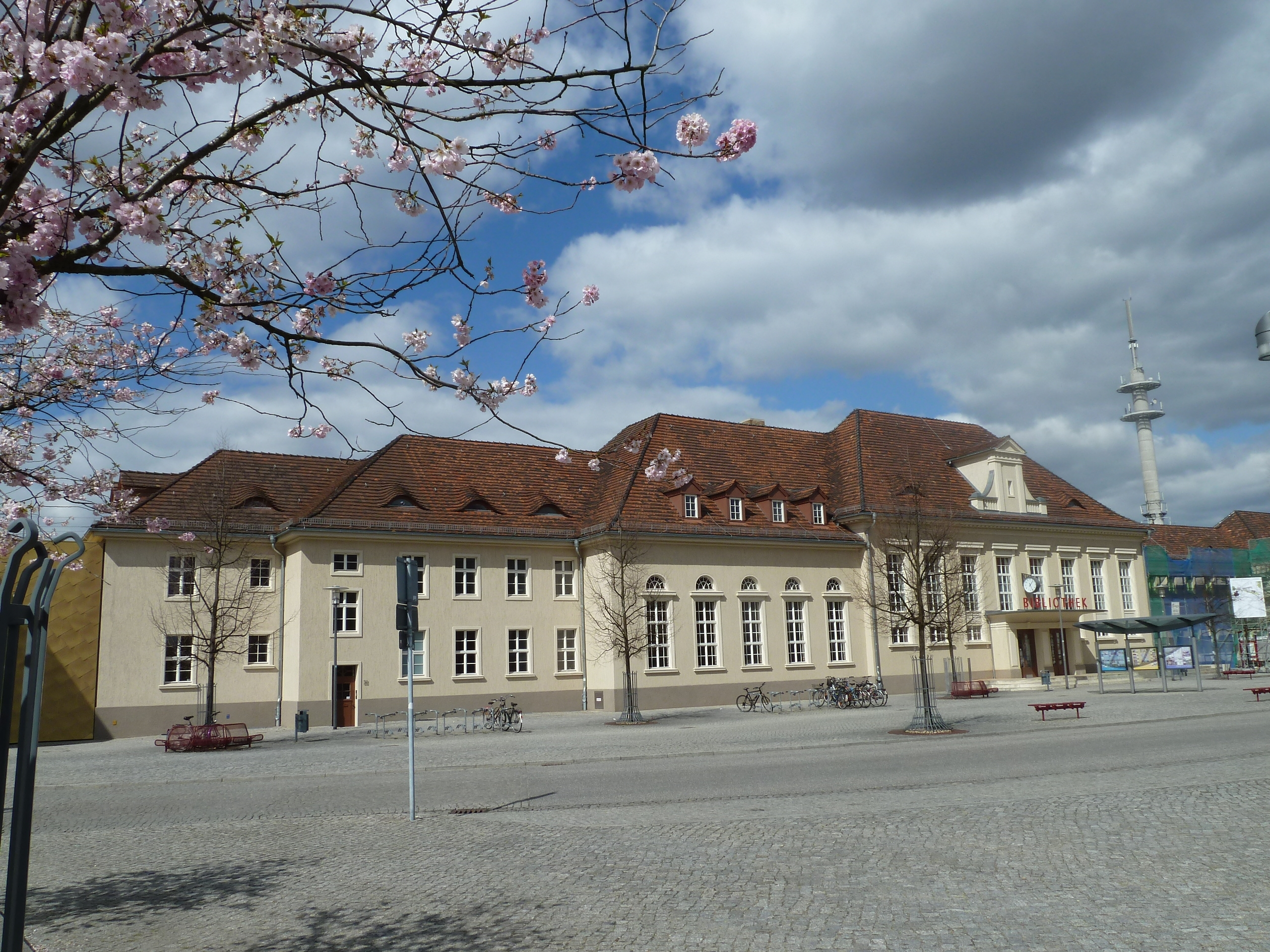
Luckenwalde station

Luckenwalde station is located on the Berlin–Halle railway.

== Notable people ==
- Marianne Adam (born 1951), shot putter
- Carl (Carlos) Anwandter (1801–1889), 1848 revolutionary, emigre to Chile
- Ilka Bessin (born 1971), comedian (Cindy aus Marzahn)
- Rudi Dutschke (1940–1979), spokesman of the German 1968 student movement, attended school in Luckenwalde
- Hans Freudenthal (1905–1990), mathematician
- Hans Grohe (1871–1955), industrialist
- Benjamin Gutsche (born 1985), screenwriter and director
- Michael Hanack (1931–2019), chemist
- Carl Harries (1866–1923), chemist
- Hans-Joachim Hecht (born 1939), chess master
- David Hollwitz (born 1989), footballer
- Bernhard Kadenbach (born 1933), biochemist
- Paul Koebe (1882–1945), mathematician
- Niklas Kohrt (born 1980), actor
- Hans Krueger (1909–1988), Gestapo officer and Holocaust perpetrator, attended school in Luckenwalde
- Susanne Lahme (born 1951), volleyball player
- Werner Lamberz (1929–1978), senior politician in the GDR, apprenticed in Luckenwalde
- Carla Nelte (born 1990), badminton player
- Maria Nicklisch (1904–1995), stage actress
- Katherina Reiche (born 1973), politician (CDU)
- Heinz-Joachim Rothenburg (born 1944), shot putter
- Herbert Schoen (1929–2014), footballer
- Franz Urbig (1864–1944), banker

== International relations ==
Luckenwalde is twinned with:

- Dieppe, Seine-Maritime, France
- Bad Salzuflen, Germany
