= List of German prisoner-of-war camps =

For lists of German prisoner-of-war camps, see:

- German prisoner-of-war camps in World War I
- German prisoner-of-war camps in World War II
