= Chaban =

Chaban or Chabán may refer to:

== Places ==
- Château de Chaban, a château in Aquitaine, France;
- Lac du Mas Chaban, an artificial lake in Parc naturel régional Périgord Limousin, Dordogne and Haute Vienne, France
- Pont Jacques Chaban-Delmas, a bridge in Bordeaux, France
- Stade Chaban-Delmas, a stadium in Bordeaux, France

== People ==
- Alejandro Chabán (born 1981), Venezuelan actor
- Danil Chaban (born 1974), Russian Olympic luger
- François Louis René Mouchard de Chaban (1757–1814), French civil servant
- Jacques Chaban-Delmas (1915–2000), French politician
- Mykola Chaban (born 1958), Ukrainian journalist
- Natalia Chaban (born 1971), Ukrainian professor of media and communications
- Omar Chabán (1952–2014), Argentinian entrepreneur

== See also ==
- Sha'ban or Cha'ban, a month on the Islamic lunar calendar
