= Oflag XIII-B =

World War II German prisoner-of-war camp

- Hammelburg, Bavaria
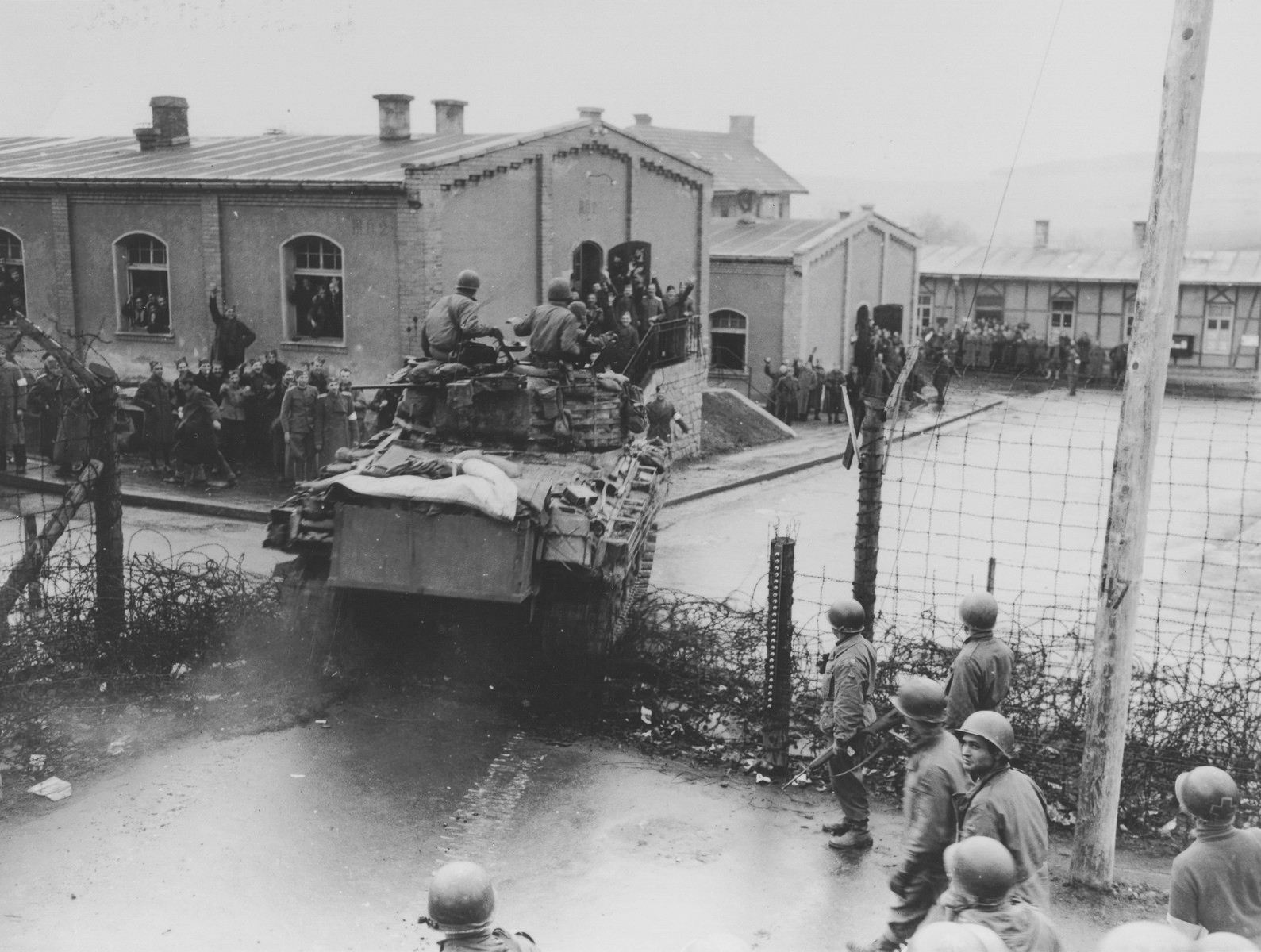
- An M4 Sherman tank of the 47th Tank Bn, 14th Armored Division (United States), crashes through the fence of Oflag XIII-B, 6 April 1945

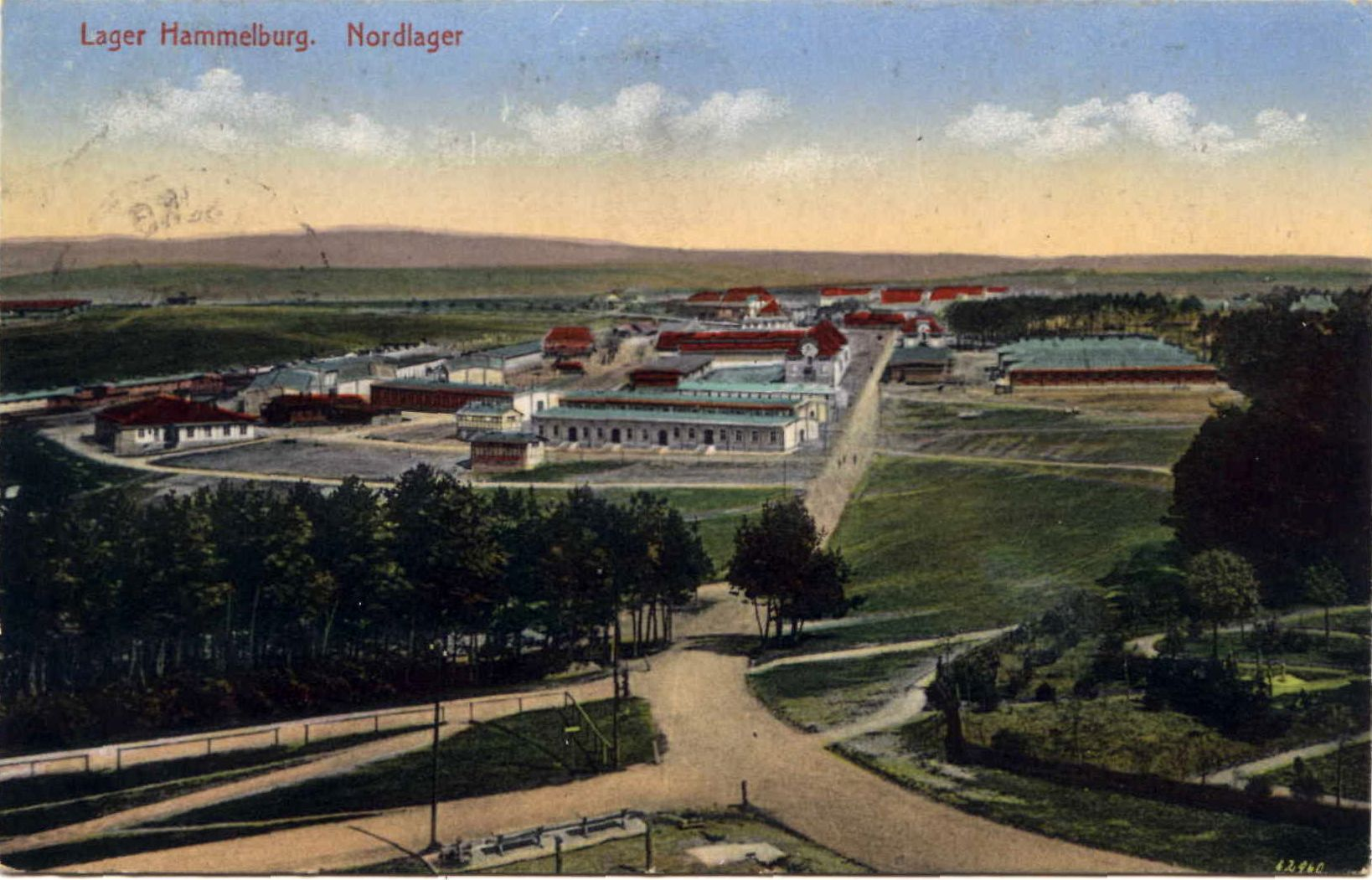
- A postcard view of Lager Hammelburg, 1916

Site information
- Type: Prisoner-of-war camp
- Controlled by: Nazi Germany

Location
- Hammelburg, Germany (pre-war borders, 1937)
- Coordinates: 50.08416°N 9.90249°E

Site history
- In use: 1943 – 1945
- Events: Hammelburg Raid

Garrison information
- Occupants: Yugoslav and U.S. officers

Oflag XIII-B was a German Army World War II prisoner-of-war camp for officers (Offizierslager), originally in the Langwasser district of Nuremberg. In 1943 it was moved to a site 3 km (1.9 mi) south of the town of Hammelburg in Lower Franconia, Bavaria, Germany.

Lager Hammelburg ("Camp Hammelburg") was a large German Army training camp, opened in 1873. Part of this camp had been used as a POW camp for Allied army personnel during World War I. After 1935 it was a training camp and military training area for the newly reconstituted Army. In World War II the Army used parts of Camp Hammelburg for Oflag XIII-B. It consisted of stone buildings. Stalag XIII-C for other ranks and NCOs was located close by.

== Camp history ==
In May 1941 part of Oflag XIII-A Langwasser, Nuremberg, was separated off, and a new camp, designated Oflag XIII-B, created for Yugoslavian officers, predominantly Serbs captured in the Balkans Campaign. In April 1943 at least 3,000 Serbian officers were moved from Langwasser to Hammelburg. Many were members of the Yugoslavian General Staff, some of whom had been POWs in Germany during the First World War.

On 11 January 1945 American officers captured during the Battle of the Bulge arrived and were placed in a separate compound. These included Lt Lyle Bouck, Intelligence and Reconnaissance Platoon, 394th Infantry Regiment, 99th Infantry Division, and Lt Donald Prell, Anti-tank Platoon, 422nd Infantry, 106th Division. By 25 January the total number of Americans was 453 officers, 12 non-commissioned officers and 18 privates.

On 10 March 1945 American officers, captured in the North Africa Campaign in 1943 or the Battle of Normandy, arrived after an eight-week 400 mi (640 km) forced march from Oflag 64 in Szubin, Poland. On 25 March there was a total of 1,291 American officers and 127 enlisted men at the camp.

Conditions for the American POWs were very poor, according to an International Red Cross inspection of 25 March 1945. Around 200 men were crowded into each barrack. The amount of coal for heating during the bitter winter months was strictly rationed, and the average temperature in the barracks was about 20 °F (−7 °C). There was no hot water for washing, and the number of latrines was inadequate. Food rations were only about 1,070 calories a day, though additional supplies, mostly root vegetables, could be bought from the canteen when available. No Red Cross parcels were delivered, so the Serbs insisted on sharing theirs.

In late March 1945 General George S. Patton ordered the 4th Armored Division to liberate the POWs in Oflag XIII-B, then 80 km (50 mi) behind the front lines. Unfortunately German resistance to the "Hammelburg Raid" was stronger than anticipated. Although Task Force Baum arrived at the camp on 27 March 1945 and attempted to liberate the U.S. POWs, the mission was a failure; of the roughly 300 men of the task force, 32 were killed in action and only 35 made it back to Allied territory, with the remainder being taken prisoner. All the 57 tanks, tank destroyers, trucks, and half-tracks were lost.

The American compound was evacuated on 28 March, when 500 POWs were transferred to the camp at Nuremberg by train. The remaining able-bodied men were marched the 90 mi (140 km) to Stalag VII-A at Moosburg. Those too sick to move were left behind with the medical staff.

The camp was captured by Combat Command B of the U.S. 14th Armored Division on 6 April 1945.

== See also ==
- List of prisoner-of-war camps in Germany
- John K. Waters, George S. Patton's son-in-law and one of the men imprisoned at Oflag XIII-B
