= Monuments of national significance in Volyn Oblast =

This is a list of national monuments of cultural heritage in Volyn Oblast.

According to the 2009 Cabinet of Ukraine statement there are a total of 23 monuments of national significance. Yet, in 2011 Petro Khodan, a head specialist in cultural heritage preservation and museumification affairs of the Regional State Administration directorate of culture and tourism, declared that in the territory of Volyn (Volhynia or Volyn Oblast) there are 202 monuments of national significance with 179 monuments of urban planning and architecture.

== Listings ==
No.	Photo	Name	Date	Location	Type	Protected number
1		Memorial complex "Eternal Glory"	1977	Lutsk, corner of prospekt Peremohy and vulytsia F. Shopena	monument of history	030001-N
2		Monument to poet and public figure Lesya Ukrainka	1976	Lutsk, Teatralny Square	monument of monumental art	030002-N
3		Hillfort "Valy"	9th-13th century	Volodymyr-Volynsky Raion, Volodymyr-Volynsky, vulytsia Soborna	monument of archaeology	030003-N
4		Memorial complex to "Victims of fascism" in place of concentration camp of prisoners of war "Oflag-365"	1967	Volodymyr-Volynsky Raion, Volodymyr-Volynsky (south-west edge)	monument of history	030004-N
5		Hillfort	5th-9th century	Volodymyr-Volynsky Raion, village Zymne	monument of archaeology	030005-N
6		House, in which lived and worked composer Igor Stravinsky	1907-1908	Volodymyr-Volynsky Raion, Ustyluh	monument of history	030006-N
7		Hillfort	14th-17th century	Horokhiv Raion, village Zhuravnyky	monument of archaeology	030007-N
8		Hillfort	9th-13th century	Horokhiv Raion, village Peremyl	monument of archaeology	030008-N
9		Battlefield of Bohdan Khmelnytsky host with the Polish army (Battle of Berestechko)	1651	Horokhiv Raion, village Pisky	monument of history	030009-N
10		Hillfort "Zamok"	9th-13th century	Ivanychi Raion, village Lytovezh	monument of archaeology	030010-N
11		Hillfort	9th-13th century	Ivanychi Raion, village Lezhnytsia	monument of archaeology	030011-N
12		Manor house of poet and public figure Lesya Ukrainka	2nd half of 19th century	Kovel Raion, village Kolodiazhne	monument of history	030012-N
13		Hillfort	11th-13th century	Lokachi Raion, urban settlement Lokachi	monument of archaeology	030013-N
14		Hillfort	9th-13th century	Lokachi Raion, village Zaturtsi	monument of archaeology	030014-N
15		Manor house of Lypynsky family	1882	Lokachi Raion, village Zaturtsi	monument of history	030015-N
16		Hillfort	9th-13th century	Lutsk Raion, village Horzvyn	monument of archaeology	030016-N
17		Hillfort	9th-13th century	Lutsk Raion, village Korshiv	monument of archaeology	030017-N
18		Hillfort	9th-13th century	Lutsk Raion, village Usychi	monument of archaeology	030018-N
19		Hillfort	9th-13th century	Lutsk Raion, village Shepel	monument of archaeology	030019-N
20		Hillfort	9th-13th century	Lyubeshiv Raion, village Vetly	monument of archaeology	030020-N
21		Hillfort "Zamchyshche"	9th-13th century	Liuboml Raion, Liuboml	monument of archaeology	030021-N
22		Hillfort	9th-13th century	Liuboml Raion, village Hushcha	monument of archaeology	030022-N
23		Memorial complex "Victims of fascism"	1980	Ratne Raion, village Kortelisy	monument of history	030023-N

== List of historic and cultural reserves ==
- Historic and Cultural Reserve "Old Lutsk"
- State Historic and Cultural Reserve "Ancient Volodymyr"
