= Oflag XIII-A =

World War II German prisoner-of-war camp

Oflag XIII-A / Oflag XIII-B / Oflag XIII-D
- Nuremberg, Bavaria

Site information
- Type: Prisoner-of-war camp
- Controlled by: Nazi Germany

Location
- Nuremberg, Germany (pre-war borders, 1937)
- Coordinates: 49.4276°N 11.1230°E

Site history
- In use: 1940 – 1945

Garrison information
- Occupants: Allied officers

Oflag XIII-A, Oflag XIII-B and Oflag XIII-D were all German World War II prisoner-of-war camp for officers (Offizierslager). They were all located on the old Nazi party rally grounds in Langwasser, Nuremberg, in northern Bavaria. They were adjacent to Stalag XIII-D.

== Camp history ==
Oflag XIII-A was opened in August 1940 to accommodate mainly French officers captured during the Battle of France. They were transferred to other camps, and the camp was closed on 29 October 1941.

In May 1941 Oflag XIII-B was created in a separate compound for Serbian officers captured during the Balkans Campaign. This camp was moved to Oflag XIII-B at Hammelburg in April 1943.

In June 1941 a new compound Oflag 62 was opened for high-ranking Soviet officers captured during Operation Barbarossa. It was redesignated Oflag XIII-D in September 1941. This camp was closed April 1942 and the surviving officers (many had died during the winter due to an epidemic) were transferred to other camps. From December 1944 to March 1945 XIII-D was designated Oflag 73 and used to accommodate officers of various nationalities evacuated hastily from camps in the east that were threatened by the rapid advance of the Red Army.

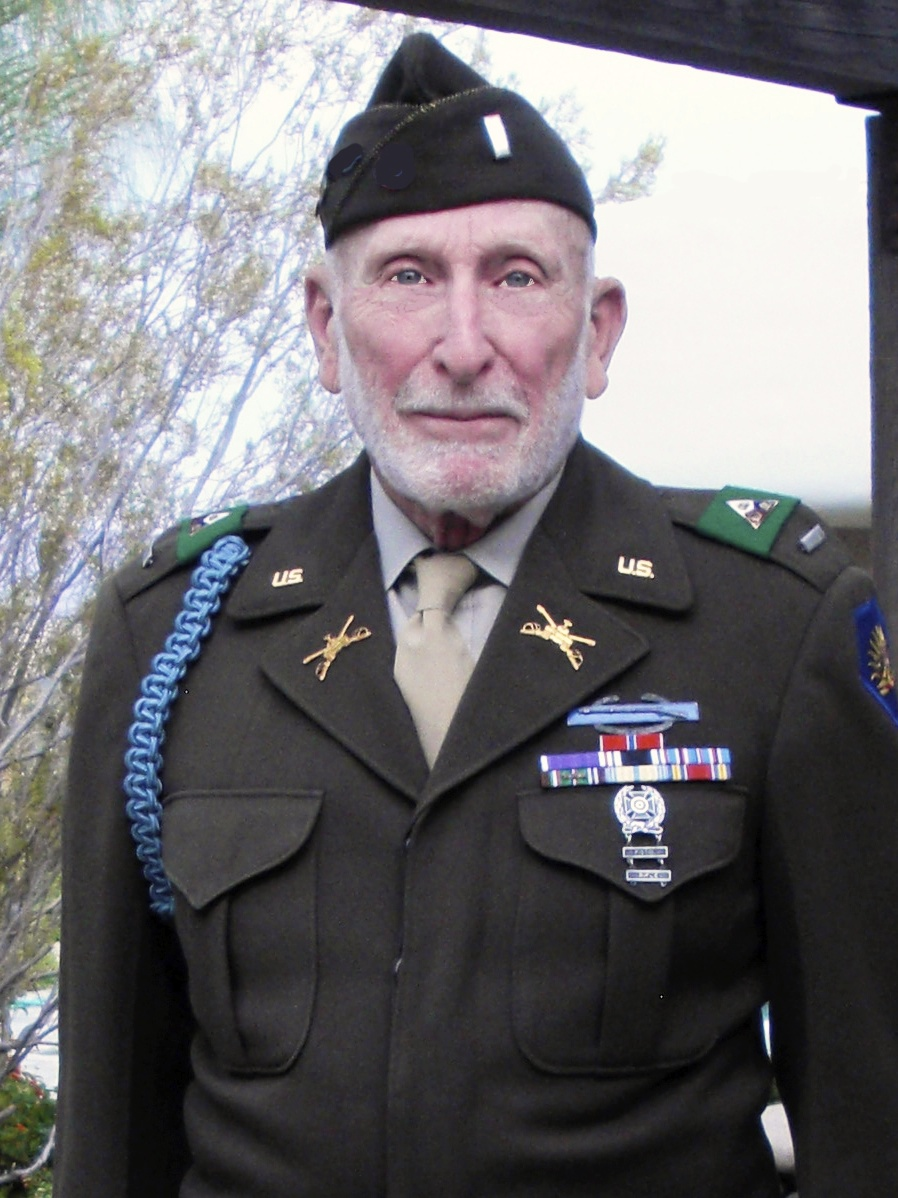
ex-POW Lt. Donald Prell wearing his WWII U.S. Army uniform in 2009

On 15 April 1945, Lt. Donald Prell (who had been recaptured after escaping from Oflag XIII-B and sent to Oflag 73) awoke to find all the camp's guards had disappeared. He and another POW walked out the front gate to freedom.

On 16 April 1945 the United States Army liberated the camp, finding only Serbian officers and those too sick to have been marched out, including some Americans who had been wounded by strafing American planes while being marched from Hammelburg.

== See also ==
- List of prisoner-of-war camps in Germany
- Oflag
