= Filipp Yershakov =

Filipp Afanasyevich Yershakov
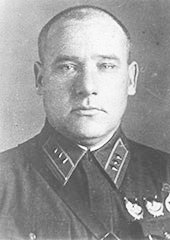
- Born: 21 January [O.S. 9 January] 1893; Taganki, Smolensk Governorate, Russian Empire
- Died: 9 June 1942 (aged 49) Hammelburg, Germany
- Allegiance: Russian Empire; Soviet Union
- Branch: Imperial Russian Army; Red Army
- Service years: 1915–1918; 1918–1942
- Rank: Lieutenant general
- Commands: 29th Rifle Division; 8th Rifle Corps; Ural Military District; 22nd Army; 20th Army
- Conflicts: World War I; Russian Civil War; World War II
- Awards: Order of the Red Banner (2)

Filipp Afanasyevich Yershakov (Russian: Филипп Афанасьевич Ершаков; 21 January [O.S. 9 January] 1893 – 9 June 1942) was a Red Army lieutenant general who held field army command during World War II. Yershakov led the 22nd Army during the Battle of Smolensk and was captured while commanding the 20th Army in the Vyazma pocket. He died in German captivity.

== Early life, World War I and Russian Civil War ==
Filipp Afanasyevich Yershakov was born in a peasant family on 21 January [O.S. 9 January] 1893 in the village of Taganki, Pyatninsky volost, Vyazemsky Uyezd, Smolensk Governorate. During World War I, he was conscripted into the Imperial Russian Army in January 1915 and assigned as a ryadovoy to the 195th Reserve Battalion of the Moscow Military District. In April of that year he was sent to the Western Front with a march company, where he was assigned to the 13th Yerevan Grenadier Regiment. Wounded in battle on 4 July 1915 near Kholm, Yershakov returned to his regiment after treatment, and graduated from its training detachment as a squad leader. In November 1916 he was transferred to the 525th Infantry Regiment, with which he fought in battles on the Northern Front in the regions of Vilno, Krevo, and Smorgon. Yershakov rose to the rank of podpraporshchik while serving with the regiment. After the October Revolution he was elected a company commander, ending his service at Borisov, where he was demobilized in April 1918.

Yershakov immediately joined the Red Army in April 1918 during the Russian Civil War, serving as a rifleman guarding the Vasileostrovsky District Soviet in Petrograd. From July of that year he served in the Separate Vasileostrovsky Battalion as a platoon commander and assistant company commander, rising to command the battalion in September. He became commander of a detachment formed from the battalion near Arkhangelsk in September. Yershakov subsequently commanded a battalion of the 158th Rifle Regiment, formed from the detachments operating in the Arkhangelsk region. The regiment fought against the White Northern Army and in May 1919 was transferred to Petrograd to fight the White Northwestern Army. Yershakov transferred to command a battalion of the 15th Rifle Regiment of the 2nd Rifle Division, then commanded a regiment. With the 2nd Rifle Division, he took part in the Polish–Soviet War.

== Interwar period ==
In November 1921, Yershakov was appointed assistant commander of the newly formed 11th Rifle Regiment. From May 1922 he commanded a battalion of the 58th Rifle Regiment, then was assistant commander of the 4th Rifle Regiment. In 1924 he graduated from the Vystrel course and was appointed assistant commander of the 98th Territorial Rifle Regiment. From October 1926 he commanded the 109th Rifle Regiment of the 37th Rifle Division, and in December transferred to command the 80th Rifle Regiment of the 27th Rifle Division. Yershakov completed the commander courses at the Military-Political Academy between November 1929 and April 1930, then returned to his previous position. From October 1931 he served in the Belorussian Military District as assistant commander of the 29th Rifle Division, and rose to command the 5th Rifle Division in February 1932. From December 1932 to November 1934 he received advanced training at the special department of the Frunze Military Academy, then was appointed commander of the 29th Rifle Division. From December 1935 he commanded the 8th Rifle Corps of the Belorussian Military District. From January 1938 he was deputy commander of the Kharkov Military District, and in July of that year rose to command the Ural Military District, receiving the rank of lieutenant general on 4 June 1940 when the Red Army introduced general ranks. In June 1941 the 22nd Army was formed from the troops of the district, and Yershakov appointed its commander. The 22nd Army was ordered to board trains bound for the Western Dvina line on 13 June, becoming part of the Reserve of the Supreme High Command.

== World War II ==
The German invasion of the Soviet Union caught Yershakov's army in the process of unloading in northeastern Belorussia. At the end of June the army began moving to the Polotsk region and was assigned to the Western Front on 2 July. Yershakov led the army in battle against the German 16th Army and 3rd Panzer Group on the line of Idritsa and Vitebsk. Subsequently, the army took part in the Battle of Smolensk on the Velikiye Luki axis. The army was forced to retreat under the attack of superior German forces. During July and August, the army foiled the German attempts to destroy the Soviet troops around Nevel and conduct a deep envelopment of the left wing of the Northwestern Front and right wing of the Western Front. In late August, Yershakov led his troops while encircled during defensive actions on the Toropets axis. Half of the army's troops were killed or captured in the Velikiye Luki pocket between 24 and 26 August and the 22nd Army was effectively knocked out of action.

In September, Yershakov was appointed commander of the 20th Army. In October, during Operation Typhoon, German troops broke through Soviet defenses and encircled several armies, including the 20th, in the Vyazma pocket.

After the destruction of his 20th Army, Yershakov found himself and a part of the commanders and commissars of his headquarters attempting to break out of encirclement for the second time in the past two months. The senior officers in the group included Colonel A. G. Narynin, 20th Army chief of staff, Colonel N. V. Kornev, army air force chief, and the 24th Army chief of signals Major General Maksim Siyayev. The group also included a captain and senior lieutenant from the supply service, two commissars, and two ordinary soldiers. Moving to the east, by 2 November, the group reached the station of Machino, 28 kilometers west of Sukhinichi, where they decided to rest for the night in one of the houses. The whereabouts of the Soviet officers quickly became known to the commander of the German 119th Railroad Battalion, who decided to search the village that night. Yershakov's entire group was captured without resistance. The prisoners of war were sent to the General Walter von Unruh, railway construction commander of Army Group Center on 4 November.

Yershakov was sent to the Stalag III-D prisoner of war camp in Wuhlheide, Berlin. In spring 1942 he was moved to the Hammelburg camp, where he died on 9 June. Yershakov was buried in the camp cemetery.

== Decorations ==
Yershakov was a recipient of the following decorations:

- Order of the Red Banner (20 February 1928, 22 February 1938)
- Jubilee Medal "XX Years of the Workers' and Peasants' Red Army"
