= Task Force Baum =

United States task force in World War II

Raid on Hammelburg
- Part of the Western Allied invasion of Germany in the Western Front of the European theatre of World War II
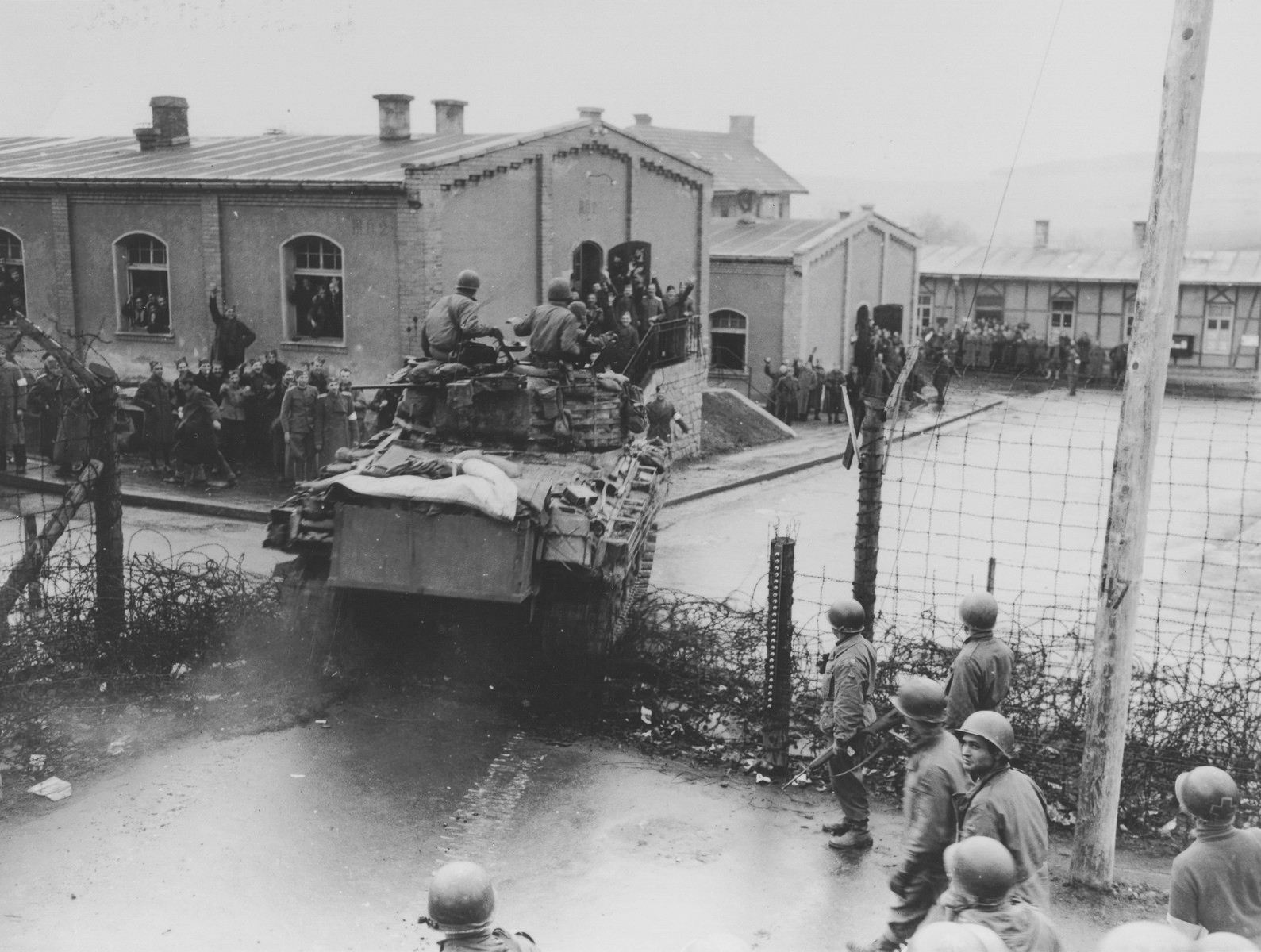
- An M4 medium tank of the 47th Tank Bn., 14th Armored Division crashes into the prison compound at Oflag XIII-B, 6 April 1945 - two weeks after the failed Task Force Baum raid.
Date	26–29 March 1945
Location	Area of Hammelburg, Germany 50.08416°N 9.90249°E
Result	German victory

Belligerents
United States	Germany

Commanders and leaders
(United States) George S. Patton (United States) Abraham Baum (surrendered)	(Nazi Germany) Heinrich Köhl

Units involved
Elements of 4th Armored Division: Task Force Baum	Elements of 251st Infantry Division: Panzerjägerabteilung 251

Strength
11 officers and 303 men 16 tanks, 28 half-tracks, and 13 other vehicles	150 men 10 Jagdpanzer 38(t) Hetzer

Casualties and losses
32 killed 256 wounded, missing or captured All tanks and vehicles destroyed or captured	30 killed/wounded 3 hetzers destroyed 3 Sd.Kfz. 251 destroyed
- Hammelburg, Germany (pre-war borders, 1937)

Task Force Baum, also known as the Hammelburg raid, was a secret and controversial World War II task force set up by U.S. Army General George S. Patton and commanded by Capt. Abraham Baum in late March 1945. Baum was given the task of penetrating 50 miles (80 km) behind German lines and liberating the POWs in camp Oflag XIII-B, near Hammelburg. Controversy surrounds the true reasons behind the mission, which most likely was to liberate Patton's son-in-law, John K. Waters, taken captive in Tunisia in 1943. The result of the mission was a complete failure; of the roughly 300 men of the task force, 32 were killed in action during the raid and only 35 made it back to Allied-controlled territory, with the remainder being taken prisoner. All of the 57 tanks, jeeps, and other vehicles were lost.

== Background ==
=== Camp Hammelburg ===
Camp Hammelburg, located 1.8 miles (3 km) south from its namesake town, was originally used as a military training ground before World War I and again before World War II. It was converted into two separate POW camps during the second war: Stalag XIII-C for Allied enlisted men and Oflag XIII-B for Allied officers.

Originally, all of the Oflag camp's occupants were Serb officers. The camp was later split into sections of American officers on one side and Serbs in the other. Most of the American portion of the camp was hastily upgraded in January 1945 after an influx of POWs from the Battle of the Bulge, which began 16 December of the previous year.

As Soviets continued a westward advance toward Germany in the winter of 1944, the POW camp Oflag 64 in Schubin, Poland was emptied of its prisoners on 21 January 1945. In the dead of winter, 1,290 POWs headed west into Germany, then south toward Hammelburg. Among them was Lt. Col. John K. Waters, General Patton's son-in-law, who had been captured in Tunisia in February 1943. Col. Paul Goode, the senior ranking officer at the camp, kept a list of the men in his ranks. Traveling 340 miles (547 km)—mostly by foot—in 7 weeks' time, the men arrived at their destination on 9 March.

By the time the men from Schubin arrived at Oflag XIII-B, the numbers in the officer camp swelled to over 1,400, though it was by far less than the estimated 5,000-man population in the enlisted men's camp by that time.

Conditions at the camp were miserable for both the prisoners and their guards. The winter of 1944 was considered one of the coldest on record. Every one of the 7 five-room buildings were crowded with two hundred men. One small room was to house 40 prisoners on bunk beds, while coal was rationed out to heat the furnaces at a rate of just 48 briquettes per stove every 3 days. Although some men were able to scavenge for wood nearby, it still was not enough to keep the soldiers warm. The average temperature in the rooms at any time was estimated to be 20 °F (−7 °C).

Food was just as scarce as heat. Initially, the men in camps were given a diet of 1,700 calories (7,100 kJ) a day, well below the 2,000 calories recommended daily allowance for men doing no work. This was cut even more as supplies ran low and the camp population increased, until an estimated 1,070 calories (4,480 kJ) were distributed daily. Many men in the camp suffered dramatic weight loss of more than 50 pounds (23 kilograms) and atrophy of muscles because of the lack of food and subsequent immobility. Dysentery due to unsterile conditions and utensils further weakened many men in the camp.

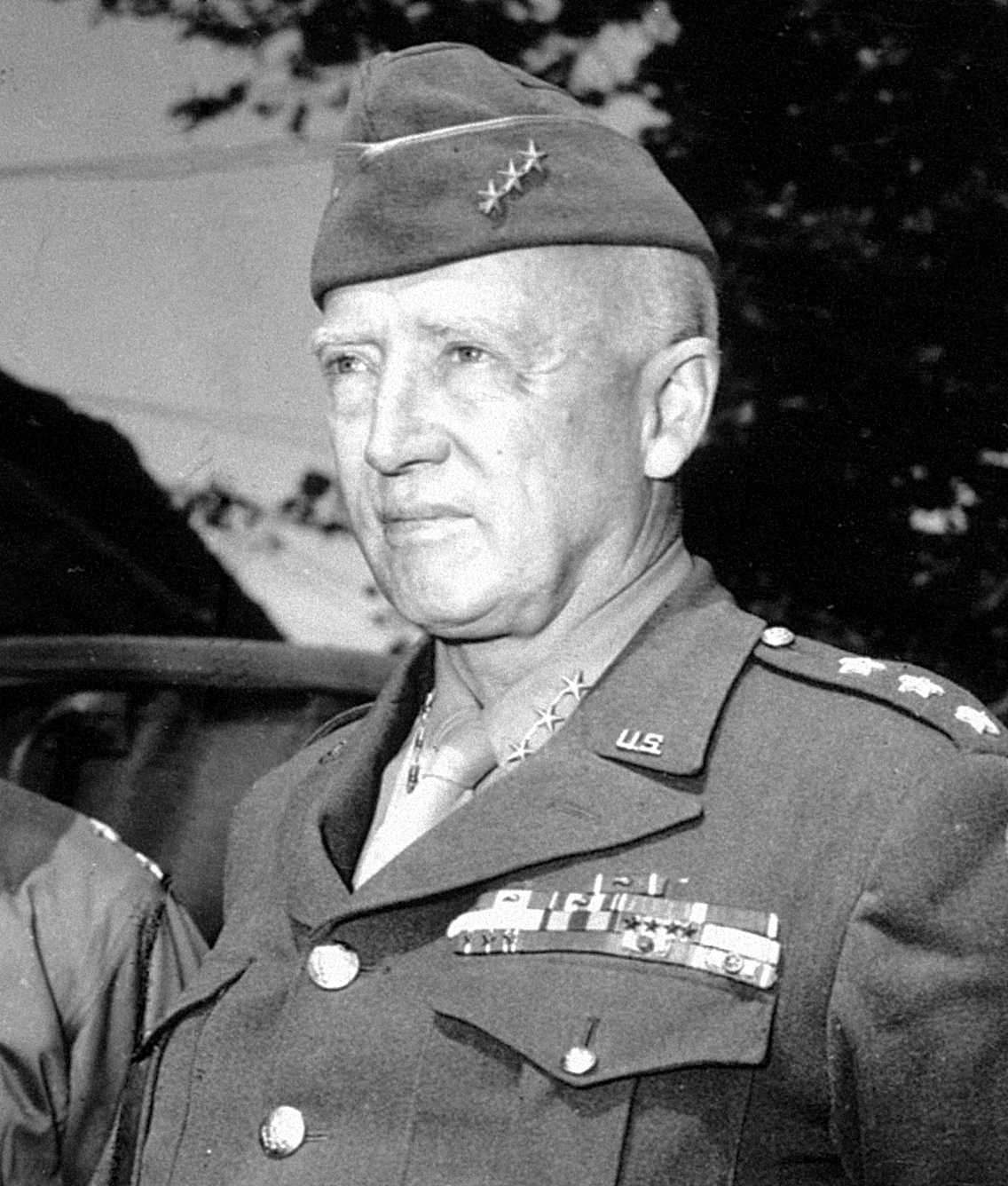
General George S. Patton

General Patton assigned the mission to Combat Command B (CCB), 4th Armored Division, commanded by Lt. Col. Creighton Abrams. Abrams wanted to use his entire combat command (two battalions and supporting artillery) but was overruled, and instead one company of medium tanks, a platoon of light tanks and one company of armored infantry were assigned to the task force. The tank battalion commander tabbed to command the mission was ill and suggested that Baum, the battalion S-3, instead lead the task force, which set out late on the evening of 26 March.

=== Task force organization ===
- Company A, 10th Armored Infantry Battalion (Capt. Robert F. Lange) – 4 officers and 169 men mounted in 15 M3A1 half-tracks
- Company C, 37th Tank Battalion (1st Lt. William J. Nutto) – 3 officers and 56 men mounted in 10 M4A3, M4A3E2, and M4A1 medium tanks, and 4 support vehicles
- 3rd Platoon, Company D, 37th Tank Battalion (2nd Lt. William G. Weaver, Jr.) – 1 officer and 18 men mounted in 5 M5A1 light tanks
- Command & Support Element, 10th Armored Infantry Battalion – 3 officers and 60 men mounted in one light tank, 12 half-tracks, and 10 other vehicles

Altogether the force numbered 11 officers and 303 men, 16 tanks, 28 half-tracks, and 13 other vehicles.

== Operation ==
=== Raid on Hammelburg ===
On the evening of 26 March, the task force reached Aschaffenburg, encountering heavy fire that disabled several vehicles, including one of the Sherman tanks. It took until early the next morning to break through the bridgehead just past the German lines.

The largest problem facing the force going into the mission was a lack of maps—15 for 57 vehicles—and lack of knowledge of the exact location of the camp, which would have to be obtained through questioning of the locals en route. This slowed the task force considerably, forcing it to take on more fire than anticipated. Furthermore, a German spotter plane shadowed the column as it neared the camp, which would help coordinate resistance to the task force. A few Jagdpanzer 38(t) "Hetzers" were sent as support.

Infantry of the 19th Armored Infantry Bn. with supporting M4 tanks from the 47th Tank Bn, during the successful drive to Hammelburg, 5 April 1945, following the failed Baum Task Force of March.

By the afternoon of the 27th, tanks had arrived in sight of the camp. Some of the guards in the camp put up resistance, though many of them fled or surrendered. The Serbian section of the camp received the brunt of American fire as it approached—likely due to the gray uniforms they wore, making them appear as Germans to the advancing columns. General Gunther von Goeckel, the camp commandant, called for Colonel John K. Waters to try to arrange a truce. Waters agreed to act as intermediary. Waters and several men, including one German officer, volunteered to exit the camp to notify the Americans of the mistake. While approaching the American column, an uninformed German soldier putting up resistance shot Waters in the buttocks before the German officer could explain the situation. He was taken back and treated for his wounds by Serbian doctors interned in the camp.

Roughly half of Baum's forces made it to Hammelburg in fighting shape. Greeted by thousands of cheering prisoners, Baum quickly realized the camp contained far more than the 300 officers they were originally planning to liberate. After calculating losses, he determined no more than two hundred men would actually be able to be taken back to Allied-controlled land with their remaining fleet. It was decided that only field-grade officers (O-4 and above) would be allowed to ride back, while any remaining men who wished to march with the columns would be allowed to do so, or they could try to travel cross-country on their own to the American lines about 50 miles to the west. Barely able to walk, the vast majority of POWs decided to stay behind. Waters, unable to be moved, was left behind in the camp.

=== Withdrawal ===
The task force left the camp at 8 pm local time to cross back across the German lines. By then, further complications had surfaced. There was no moon out that night, so only artificial light could be used for navigation, which could be spotted easily by the growing number of German troops in the area. Only one reconnaissance jeep was able to scout ahead of the column to find an escape route. Sometimes the tanks had to be turned off entirely to avoid detection by a growing German encirclement.

Nearing Höllrich in the black of night, Task Force Baum encountered a German ambush laid by veteran soldiers of the German Infantry Combat School in Hammelburg (nearly 100 NCOs in officer training). The first tank was hit by a German panzerfaust, abandoned, and captured. Then, a German drove this tank into a garden and a second answered the radio calls in English to lure more tanks into the ambush. The Germans used their Sherman prize with good effect against the other U.S. tanks. Four American Sherman tanks were destroyed.

The remnants of the task force regrouped again after pulling back to a quiet area near Hill 427 in the early morning hours. Without enough fuel to make it back across the line by now, the task force waited for daylight to travel with visibility to maximize the distance they could travel. Colonel Goode, knowing most of the men would be unable to travel across the line on their own, advised that most of the walking wounded should head back to the Oflag. Colonel Goode himself decided not to slow the rest of the task force down and began the march back under a white flag.

Baum gave the order to move out shortly after dawn on 28 March. Just as the column started up, they immediately came under fire from all directions. Germans, having surrounded the hill during the night, opened fire on the first sign of mobilization. Knowing there was no way of fending off the attack, Baum ordered every man for himself. The battle lasted mere minutes before the survivors who hadn't escaped into the woods were lined up as fresh POWs. Baum managed to escape with two soldiers into the nearby woods, as did a number of American POWs from the camp. Baum was Jewish and discarded his dog tags, believing he would be shot on sight if identified.

== Aftermath ==
As the Soviets were encroaching from the east, the Americans began advancing into Germany days after the task force, with Germans moving POWs farther away from combat zones. Those able to move were rounded up into unmarked boxcars and sent via train to Nuremberg, then to other prisoner camps away from the front lines. The remaining men were left behind at Hammelburg.

Baum was shot in the groin while trying to flee back to allied lines and captured by the Volkssturm. He joined Waters in the Serbian hospital at the Hammelburg camp, which was liberated by the 14th Armored Division on 6 April — just 9 days after the failed liberation by Task Force Baum. Ironically, the failure of the task force did help set Waters free sooner: had he not been shot he would have been marched off to a camp farther into Germany with the rest of the POWs.

Patton was alleged to have offered Baum a Medal of Honor for a successful completion of the mission. As a Medal of Honor warrants an investigation into the events behind the awarding of it, which Patton would not have wanted, Baum received a Distinguished Service Cross. Patton awarded it to him personally.

It is disputed whether Patton knew his son-in-law was being held at the camp, but many at the camp and Abraham Baum believed so. Patton sent an aide, Major Alexander Stiller, with the task force, purportedly to identify Waters so he could be taken back with them. Diaries that Patton made publicly available indicate he was unaware of Waters' presence there until after the task force had arrived, but a letter written to his wife just after the task force left indicates otherwise.

I sent a column to a place forty miles east of where John [Waters] and some 900 prisoners are said to be. I have been nervous as a cat… as everyone but me thought it too great a risk…. If I lose that column, it will possibly be a new incident. But I won’t lose it." (The Longest Winter, p. 207)

A furious General Eisenhower reprimanded Patton for the incident. While Patton admitted the failure of the mission, he defended his actions due to fear that retreating Germans might kill the prisoners in the camp. The Malmedy massacre during the Battle of the Bulge and the Stalag Luft III murders showed that the Germans were more than capable of the intentional killing of POWs. According to Patton, the mistake was sending a force too small to perform the mission, saying, "I can say this, that throughout the campaign in Europe I know of no error I made except that of failing to send a combat command to take Hammelburg".

As a footnote, Captain Abe Baum was born in the Bronx, New York, 29 March 1921. He died, age 91, at his home in Rancho Bernardo, California on 3 March 2013. Baum fought at Normandy, suffering shrapnel wounds in a mine field. By March he was a battle-toughened officer. Surprised when Patton personally gave him his orders for the raid to Hammelburg, he later remarked: "I thought, what the hell am I doing here?"

== See also ==
- Oflag XIII-B
- Stalag 17
