= Bernard Benson =

British inventor and author (1922–1996)

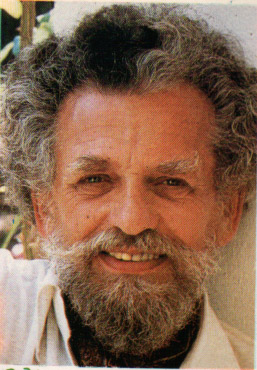
- Bernard Benson in France in the 1960s
- Born: Bernard S. Benson; 28 January 1922
- Died: 15 May 1996 (aged 74)
- Occupations: Inventor, author
- Employers: Douglas Aircraft Company; Benson-Lehner Corporation
- Spouses: Jane Lysbeth Saville Sneath; Maryse Lheureux
- Children: 10
- Military career
- Allegiance: United Kingdom
- War: World War II

Bernard S. Benson (28 January 1922 – 15 May 1996) was a British inventor and author.

== Biography ==
Benson was a fighter pilot during World War II, and later worked on the design of early British missiles. He emigrated to the United States where at Douglas Aircraft Company., in Santa Monica, California, he worked on the Douglas F4D Skyray fighter and various Douglas missiles.

Early in the 1950s, he founded Benson-Lehner Corporation with George F. G. Lehner, a psychology professor at UCLA. Soon after its founding, futurist Donald Prell joined the company as vice president, Application Engineering. The new company was successful, as it filled a niche designing systems that were used to provide data input and output to and from the early computers. The B/L machines semi-automatically read oscillograph and photographic flight test data producing punched tape and IBM punch cards which were then entered into computers. After being processed, the data was then automatically printed on large flatbed graph-plotters. This process automated the formerly manual reading and subsequent hand-plotting of data. B/L plotters soon became the industry standard, and were sold worldwide. After an IPO, the company expanded into the field of high speed photography. Two photo-mechanical engineers, Guy Hearon and Harry Katt, were hired, who designed a series of 16mm, 35mm, and 70mm high speed cameras and accessories. Trade catalogs from the Benson-Lehner Corporation are held by the National Museum of American History Library.

In 1961, Benson was one of the first people to warn against the privacy risks raised by computers, claiming that digital data could one day be fed into a single system, leaving individuals at the mercy "of who or what controls the machine".

=== Writing ===
Books that Benson wrote included: The Minstrel, an allegorical story about Elvis Presley, Alice in Plunderland, Strictly Birdsmanship (or how to lay the egg that kills the golden goose), On Being an Egghead; or Engineersmanship for the Shell of it, and The Peace Book.

=== Retirement ===
Early in the 1960s, Benson retired and moved to France, where he purchased the Chateau de Chaban located in the Dordogne. While living there with his first wife Jane Lysbeth Saville Sneath and their seven children, he began writing children's books based on the philosophy of a group of Tibetan monks, who shared his estate. Benson tried to make their philosophy readily understandable to both young and old. He then married Maryse Lheureux and had three daughters.

In 1975, during a visit to France by H.H. the 16th Karmapa, Rangjung Rigpe Dorje, he offered land to the Karmapa. Dhagpo Kagyu Ling, the Karmapa's main seat in Europe, was founded there in 1976.
