= George B. Turner =

U.S. Medal of Honor recipient

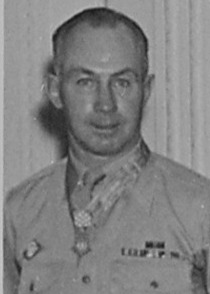
- George Turner after receiving his Medal of Honor from President Harry S. Truman on August 23, 1945
- Born: June 27, 1899; Longview, Texas, US
- Died: June 29, 1963 (aged 64); Encino, California, US
- Burial place: Arlington National Cemetery
- Military career
- Allegiance: United States
- Branch: United States Marine Corps; United States Army
- Service years: 1918 (USMC), 1942 - 1945 (US Army)
- Rank: Private First Class
- Units: 499th Armored Field Artillery Battalion, 14th Armored Division
- Conflicts: World War II
- Awards: Medal of Honor

George Benton Turner (June 27, 1899 – June 29, 1963) was a United States Army soldier and a recipient of the United States military's highest decoration, the Medal of Honor, for his actions in World War II.

== Biography ==
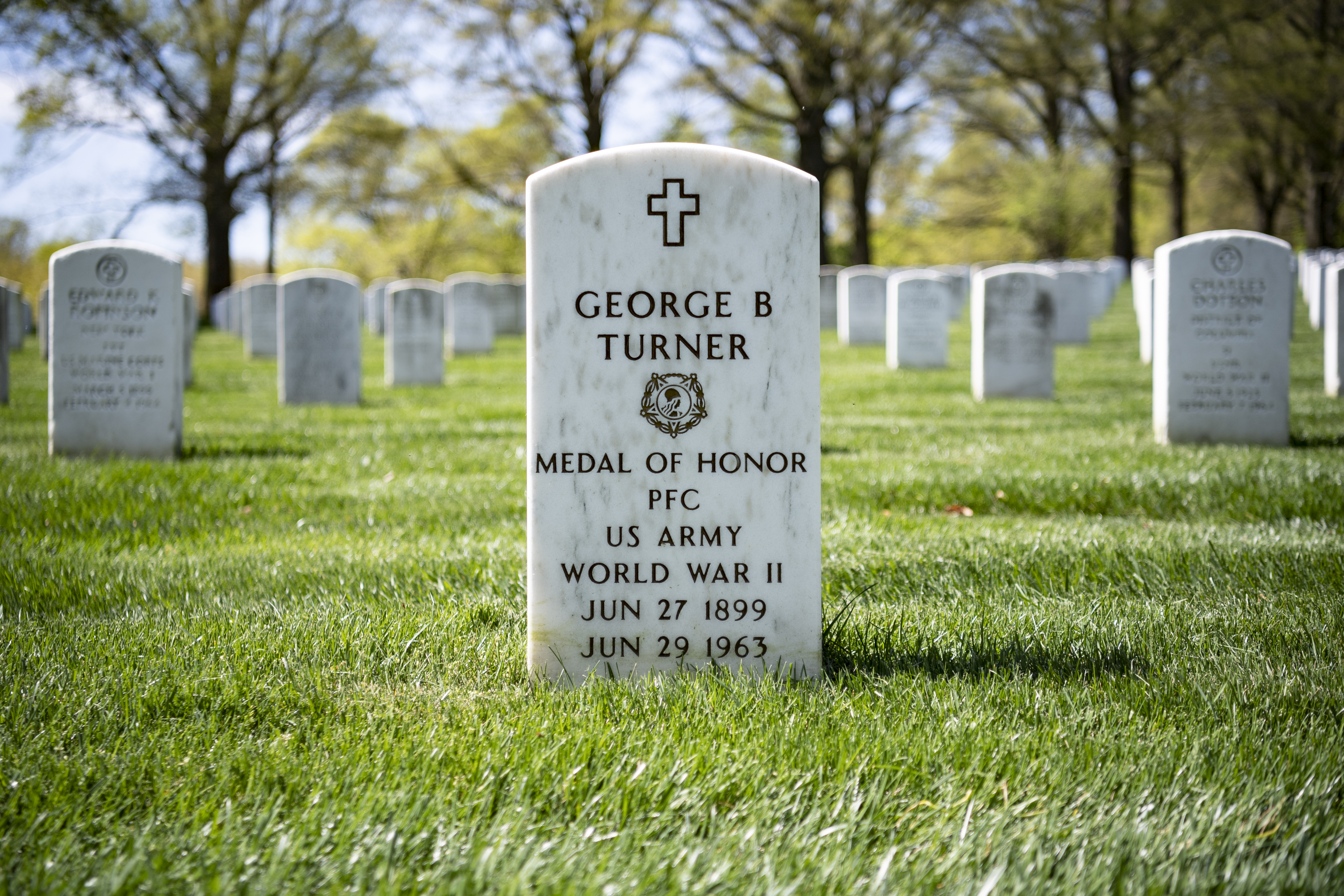
Grave at Arlington National Cemetery

Turner was educated at Wentworth Military Academy in Lexington, Missouri. In 1918, he left Wentworth at 19 years old to fight in the First World War in the U.S. Marine Corps, but the war ended before he was able to go overseas to join in the fighting. With the mass drawdown in force by the U.S. military at the war's end, Turner was soon discharged. During the 1920s he moved to California, where he worked as a legal secretary for a law office.

When the U.S. entered the Second World War, Turner volunteered once again to defend his country. He joined the Army from Los Angeles in October 1942, and was assigned to C Battery of the 499th Armored Field Artillery Battalion, 14th Armored Division. For his actions on January 3, 1945, he received the Medal of Honor from President Harry S. Truman on August 23, 1945. Turner was 46 years old at the time he received the award.

Turner is the sole second former student of Wentworth Military Academy and College to receive the Medal of Honor, and the sole recipient of the medal for the 14th Armored Division.

Turner left the U.S. Army after World War II ended. He returned to California and lived out the rest of his life there, dying in 1963. He was buried at Arlington National Cemetery, at Section 41, Site 589.

== Awards ==
- Medal of Honor
- Purple Heart
- Good Conduct Medal
- World War I Victory Medal
- American Campaign Medal
- European-African-Middle Eastern Campaign Medal with 3 campaign stars
- World War II Victory Medal
- Army of Occupation Medal
- Texas Legislative Medal of Honor (2019)

=== Medal of Honor citation ===
His MOH citation read:

“The President of the United States takes pleasure in awarding the MEDAL of HONOR to PRIVATE FIRST CLASS GEORGE B. TURNER, BTRY. C, 499th ARMORED FIELD ARTILLERY BN. UNITED STATES ARMY for service as set forth in the following CITATION:

Private Turner, at Phillippsbourg, France, on 3 January 1945 was cut off from his artillery unit by an enemy armored infantry attack. Coming upon a friendly infantry company withdrawing under the vicious onslaught, he noticed two German tanks and approximately seventy-five supporting foot soldiers advancing down the main street of the village. Seizing a rocket launcher, he advanced under intense small arms and cannon fire to meet the tanks and standing in the middle of the road, fired at them, destroying one and disabling the second. From a nearby half-track he then dismounted a machine gun, placed it in the open street and fired into the enemy infantrymen, killing or wounding a great number and breaking up the attack. In the American counterattack which followed, two supporting tanks were disabled by an enemy antitank gun. Firing a light machine gun from the hip, Private Turner held off the enemy so that the crews of the disabled vehicles could extricate themselves. He ran through a hail of fire to one of the tanks which had burst into flames and attempted to rescue a man who had been unable to escape; but an explosion of the tank’s ammunition frustrated his effort and wounded him painfully. Refusing to be evacuated, he remained with the infantry until the following day, driving off an enemy patrol with serious casualties, assisting in capturing a hostile strong point and voluntarily and fearlessly driving a truck through heavy enemy fire to deliver wounded men to the rear aid station. The great courage displayed by Private Turner and his magnificently heroic initiative contributed materially to the defense of the French town and inspired the troops about him.”

Turner was the only recipient of the Medal of Honor from the 14th Armored Division during World War II. President Harry S. Truman remarked while presenting Turner the Medal of Honor: "I would rather have that medal than be president of the United States."

== See also ==
- List of Medal of Honor recipients for World War II
