= John K. Waters =

United States Army general (1906–1989)

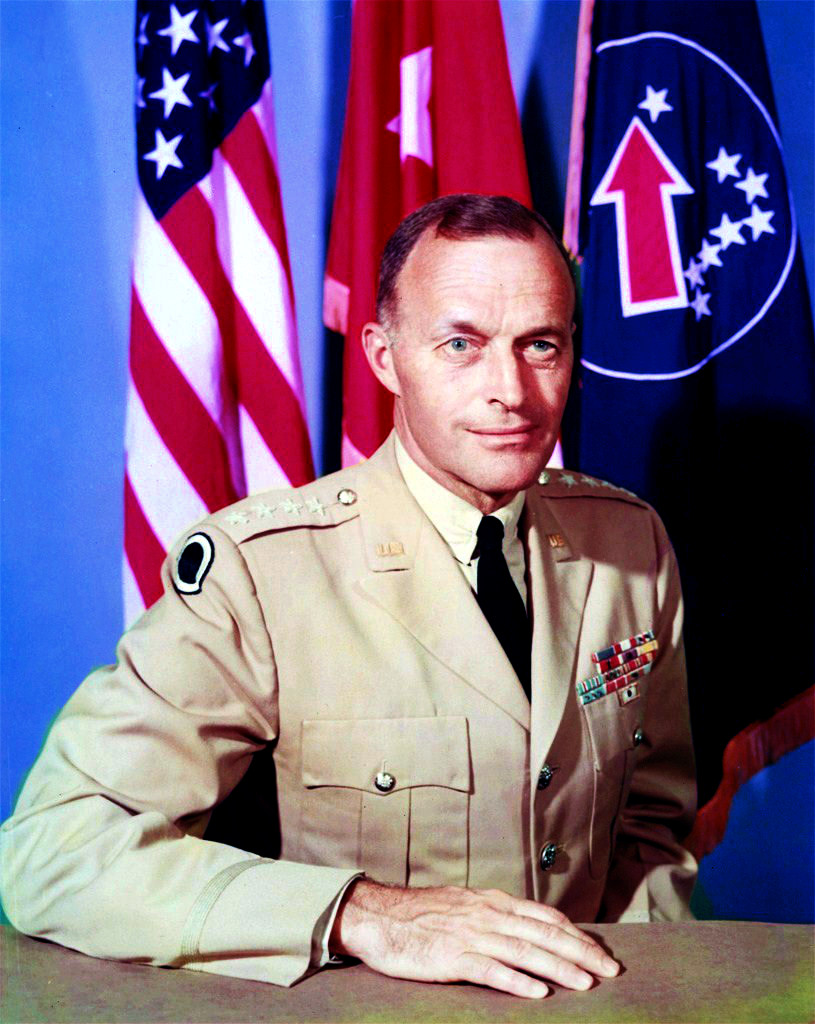
- General John K. Waters
- Born: 20 December 1906; Baltimore, Maryland, United States
- Died: 9 January 1989 (aged 82); Washington, D.C., United States
- Burial place: Sparks, Maryland
- Relatives: George S. Patton (father-in-law)
- Military career
- Allegiance: United States of America
- Branch: United States Army
- Service years: 1931–1966
- Rank: General
- Nickname: Johnnie
- Commands: U.S. Army, Pacific; Fifth Army; V Corps; 4th Armored Division
- Conflicts: World War II; Korean War
- Awards: Army Distinguished Service Cross; Army Distinguished Service Medal; Silver Star (3)

John Knight Waters (20 December 1906 – 9 January 1989) was a United States Army four-star general who served as commander, U.S. Army, Pacific from 1964 to 1966. He was also the son-in-law of General George S. Patton. During World War II, he was taken prisoner while fighting in Tunisia in 1943, leading Patton to set up the controversial Task Force Baum to break him out.

== Early career ==
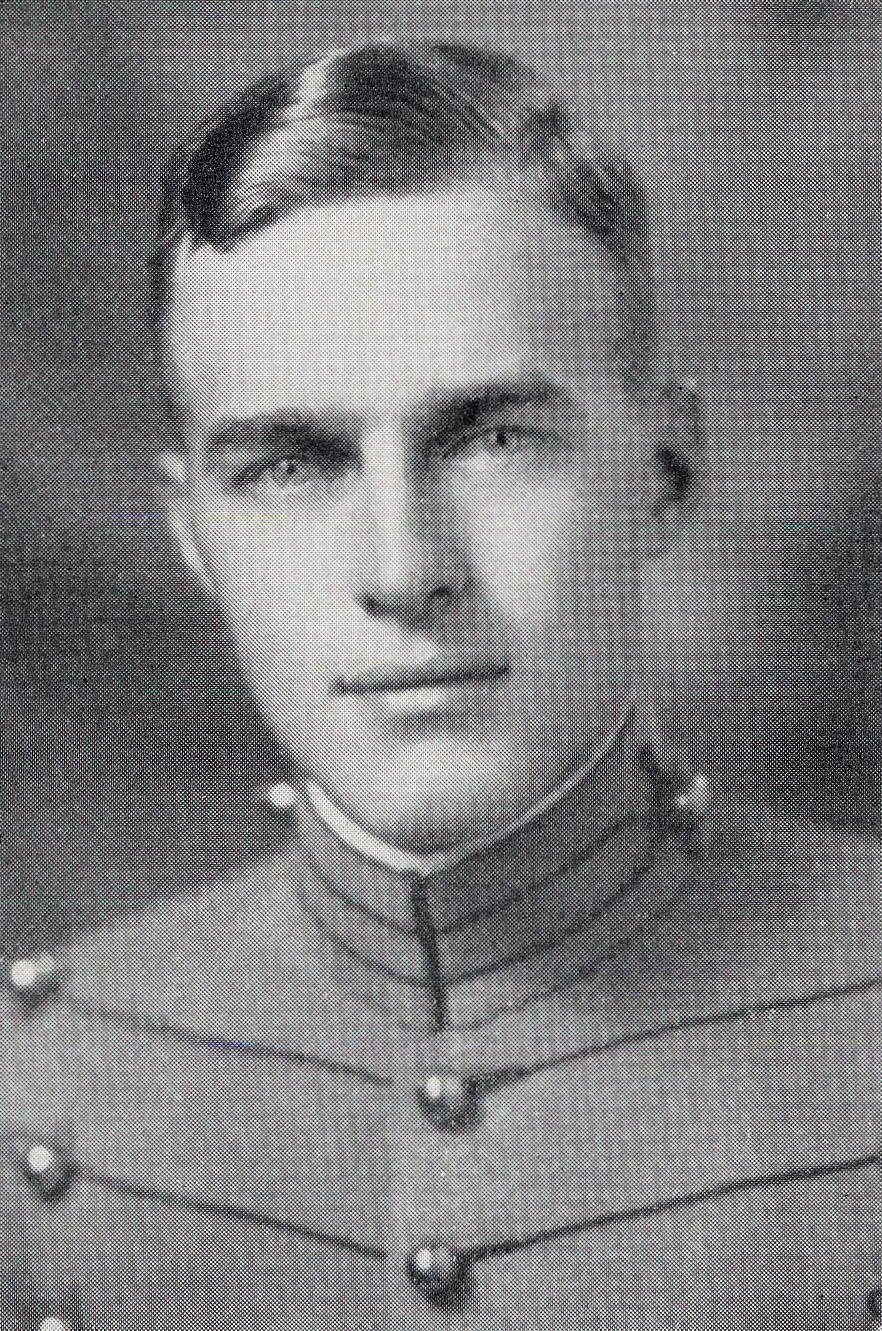
Waters as a United States Military Academy cadet c. 1931

Waters graduated from The Boys' Latin School in Baltimore in 1925 and then attended Johns Hopkins University in Maryland for two years before deciding he wanted a military career. He relocated to Illinois in order to obtain an appointment to the United States Military Academy, from which he graduated in 1931 with a commission in the cavalry.

== World War II ==
Waters was captured in Tunisia at Dejebel Lassouda when German forces attacked Sidi bou Zid during World War II.

Waters, who had married General George S. Patton's daughter Beatrice in 1934, was one of many officers interned at Hammelburg. Patton claimed that he did not know that Waters was at OFLAG XIII-B and that he feared the Germans would execute the POWs rather than let them be liberated. According to some sources the Third Army had received intelligence that Waters was indeed at the camp, having recently been moved there from Oflag 64.

The task force, known as Task Force Baum, reached the camp, which was 50 miles behind the front lines, on 27 March 1945 with some losses after running into several German units detraining in a marshalling area. It had been shadowed by a German observation plane while en route, and its intentions were anticipated.

Lt. Donald Prell, who was a POW with Waters at the camp, documented the events of that day, as did Father Paul. W. Cavanaugh, a U.S. Army Chaplain and fellow POW.

Waters had been shot by a defending guard as he and a German officer were trying to contact the task force. Badly wounded, he was treated by a Serbian doctor, Colonel Radovan Danic, the chief surgeon of the former Yugoslavian Army, who was also interned at the camp. The camp was liberated about a week to ten days later, but the only prisoners there were badly wounded and sick, the rest (including the remnants of Task Force Baum) having been moved farther east.

== Later career ==
Waters returned to duty in 1946 and became commandant of cadets at West Point. In 1949 he became an hereditary member of the Maryland Society of the Cincinnati.

He was promoted to brigadier general in 1952 when he deployed to Korea as Chief of Staff for I Corps. His major command assignments include Commanding General for the 4th Armored Division and Commanding General for V Corps, both in Europe, as well as Commanding General for the Fifth United States Army, then headquartered in Chicago.

Significant other assignments for Waters were as Chief of the American Military Assistance Staff in Yugoslavia from 1955 to 1957, and as Deputy Chief of Staff for Materiel Developments, Fort Monroe, Virginia. He also commanded the latter unit before taking command of U.S. Army, Pacific in Hawaii. He retired on 31 August 1966.

Major awards for Waters include the Distinguished Service Cross for his actions leading fellow prisoners, the Army Distinguished Service Medal, the Silver Star, the Bronze Star, the Purple Heart, and the Korean Service Medal. He died on 9 January 1989, at the Walter Reed Army Medical Center in Washington, due to heart failure.

== Family ==
He married Beatrice Patton, daughter of General George S. Patton, on 27 June 1934. The wedding took place at St. John's Church in Beverly Farms, Massachusetts, with a reception immediately afterward at the Patton home of Green Meadows, South Hamilton, Massachusetts.

The couple had two sons, John Knight and George Patton. George Patton has a son named George Patton Waters, Jr. who was born in Baton Rouge, Louisiana, attended Southern Methodist University and currently owns a real estate firm called Waters Investments.

== Dates of rank ==
Insignia	Rank	Component	Date
No insignia	Cadet	United States Military Academy	1 July 1927
	Second lieutenant	Regular Army	11 June 1931
	First lieutenant	Regular Army	1 August 1935
	Captain	Army of the United States	9 September (accepted 8 October) 1940
	Captain	Regular Army	11 June 1941
	Major	Army of the United States	1 February 1942
	Lieutenant colonel	Army of the United States	1 August 1942
	Colonel	Army of the United States	19 July 1945
	Lieutenant colonel	Army of the United States	1 June 1946 (reverted)
	Lieutenant colonel	Regular Army	1 July 1948
	Colonel	Army of the United States	7 September 1950
	Brigadier general	Army of the United States	4 July 1952
	Major general	Army of the United States	1 July 1951 (backdated)
	Colonel	Regular Army	3 August 1953
	Brigadier general	Regular Army	22 May 1957
	Major general	Regular Army	2 August 1960
	Lieutenant general	Army of the United States	30 August 1961
	General	Army of the United States	28 February 1963
