= Benson-Lehner Corporation =

American manufacturer of data processing equipment

- Company type: Public
- Industry: Data Processing
- Founded: 1950; 76 years ago in Santa Monica, California
- Founders: Bernard Benson and George Lehner
- Fate: Acquired by United Gas Corporation in 1965

Benson-Lehner Corporation was an early digital technology company that initially made plotters and other input-output devices that were purchased by branches of the U.S. government during the Cold War. It later marketed high-speed precision cameras used for similar military applications, including nuclear bomb and missile testing. Benson-Lehner’s executives were almost entirely WW2 veterans. Its founders were Bernard Benson, a former British Spitfire pilot, and George Lehner, a UCLA psychology professor and inventor. Benson-Lehner was initially based in Santa Monica and had manufacturing plants in England and France. It was later headquartered in West Los Angeles and Van Nuys.

== Business model ==
Benson-Lehner's primary business was producing and selling electronic plotting machines that would take tables of X and Y-coordinate data and plot them out on paper, providing a graphical representation of the data.

== Other Products ==
- Computyper — Benson-Lehner developed an electromechanical calculator suitable for accounting and data processing functions as a "side job", done more as an engineering exercise than anything else. This machine integrated a modified Friden, Inc. electromechanical calculator with a solenoid-activated electric typewriter, the IBM Model B, together with relay and stepper switch logic, to make an automatic calculating machine that used the typewriter to input and print the results of calculations on punch paper. Benson-Lehner called the machine the "Computyper". The company tried in vain to market the machine, but didn't meet with much success, and sold the business unit to Friden. Friden kept the Computyper name (calling it the Friden Computyper), and began making refinements to the Benson-Lehner design, creating different versions of the Computyper that had successively more features.
- High-Speed Film Camera — Benson-Lehner also developed a photo instrumentation business, which included high speed 16mm, 35mm, and 70mm motion picture cameras for aerospace applications.

== Key Figures ==
- Bernard Benson—Benson, who co-founded the company with Lehner, had worked at Douglas Aircraft in Santa Monica previously. During WW2 Benson flew Spitfire fighter planes for the RAF. Variously termed "eccentric" and "brilliant", Benson fathered 10 children, built a hardened bomb shelter on his beachfront property in Malibu, and wrote and illustrated various books extolling world peace.
- George F.G. Lehner—Lehner, who co-founded the company with Benson, was a UCLA psychology professor. In 1941 he enlisted in the U.S. Army, where he reached the rank of Major, working in the aviation psychology program on the selection of pilots, bombardiers and navigators. He later obtained a patent for a reading accelerator designed to improve reading speed and comprehension. Apart from his inventions, his professional expertise was in the areas of interpersonal competence, executive development, and team and organization effectiveness.
- George M. Ryan—Ryan was employed by Benson-Lehner twice, first as a developer of the "Computyper" product and later as its president. He had served as a U.S. Army officer in WW2 prior to earning an accounting degree. Subsequent to his tenure with Benson-Lehner, Ryan headed a number of technology companies, including CADO Systems.
- Ed Jessup—Jessup served as Benson-Lehner's general counsel in conjunction with his practice at Ervin, Cohen & Jessup LLP in Beverly Hills. Jessup had served as a U.S. Navy officer during WW2 in both the Atlantic and Pacific theaters. He went on to a distinguished 70 year legal career.
- Donald Prell—Prell joined Benson-Lehner as its vice president of Application Engineering, but he functioned in more of a general executive capacity, overseeing staff and executive hiring and participating directly in the marketing of the company's products to the military. Prell had served as a junior officer in the U.S. Army in Europe during WW2 where he'd been wounded and captured by the Germans. Upon his return to studies at UCLA after the war, he changed his academic focus from mathematics to psychology, eventually leading him to do graduate work at the University of London under Hans Eysenck, where he devised both written and oral intelligence tests. These tests became an integral part of Benson-Lehner's recruiting process.
- Leonard M. Sperry—Sperry was an investor in and director of Benson-Lehner. Sperry also invested in Max Palevsky's other computer ventures while Palevsky was consulting with Benson-Lehner. Sperry was a significant civic leader in Los Angeles. Upon his death, his widow created the Leonard M. Sperry Center for Intergroup Cooperation in Rome, in conjunction with the Vatican.
- Max Palevsky—Palevsky was a key consultant for Benson-Lehner in its early years of operation. Later, Ryan granted Palevsky use of the company's offices while he worked on separate projects. During World War II Palevsky served with the Army Air Corps doing electronics repair work on airplanes in New Guinea. He later attended the University of Chicago on the G.I. Bill, earning bachelor’s degrees in mathematics and philosophy in 1948. He went on to do graduate work in mathematics and philosophy at the University of Chicago, the University of California, Berkeley, and UCLA. After his involvement with Benson-Lehner, Palevsky became wealthy as the founder of Scientific Data Systems. His fortune enabled investments in films and donating to liberal political causes.
- Guy H. Hearon, Jr. -- Hearon joined Benson-Lehner to found their high-speed film unit. Hearon served with the U.S. Army during WW2 in the Pacific Theater Prior to joining Benson-Lehner, Hearon worked for Mitchell Camera Corp designing motion picture cameras and at Hughes Aircraft designing radar antennas for the F-86 military aircraft. He then worked for Vought Camera Corp in Beverly Hills as Chief Engineer. He designed the first 16mm pulse and high-speed instrumentation cameras for the aerospace industry. Hearon was a Vice President of Benson-Lehner Corp, where he developed their photo instrumentation business, which included high speed 16mm, 35mm, and 70mm motion picture cameras for aerospace applications.
- Jean Mourier (France) was involved in Benson in early 1956. He was a skilled technician in the C.E.V of Bretigny (Paris region). When he was in USA in 1954 for studies in the University of Toledo; since he was already in the US, he was mandated by the head of CEV to learn the Benson-Lehner technology. The objective was to be able to install and maintain the equipment purchased by the C.e.v. After having installed various Benson-Lehner machines in the C.e.v de Bretigny (Centre d'éssai en vol), Bernard Benson asked Jean Mourier to create a subsidiary in France to sell and maintain its products in Europe. This subsidiary was successful between 1956 and 1966.

== Legacy ==
The company was acquired by United Gas Corporation in 1964 to further that entity’s strategic interest in operating data processing centers for military and civil government agencies. Benson retired to France, where he purchased a chateau in the Dordogne and became involved with world peace initiatives. He eventually donated his chateau to an order of Tibetan monks.
