= Donald Prell =

American futurologist and businessman

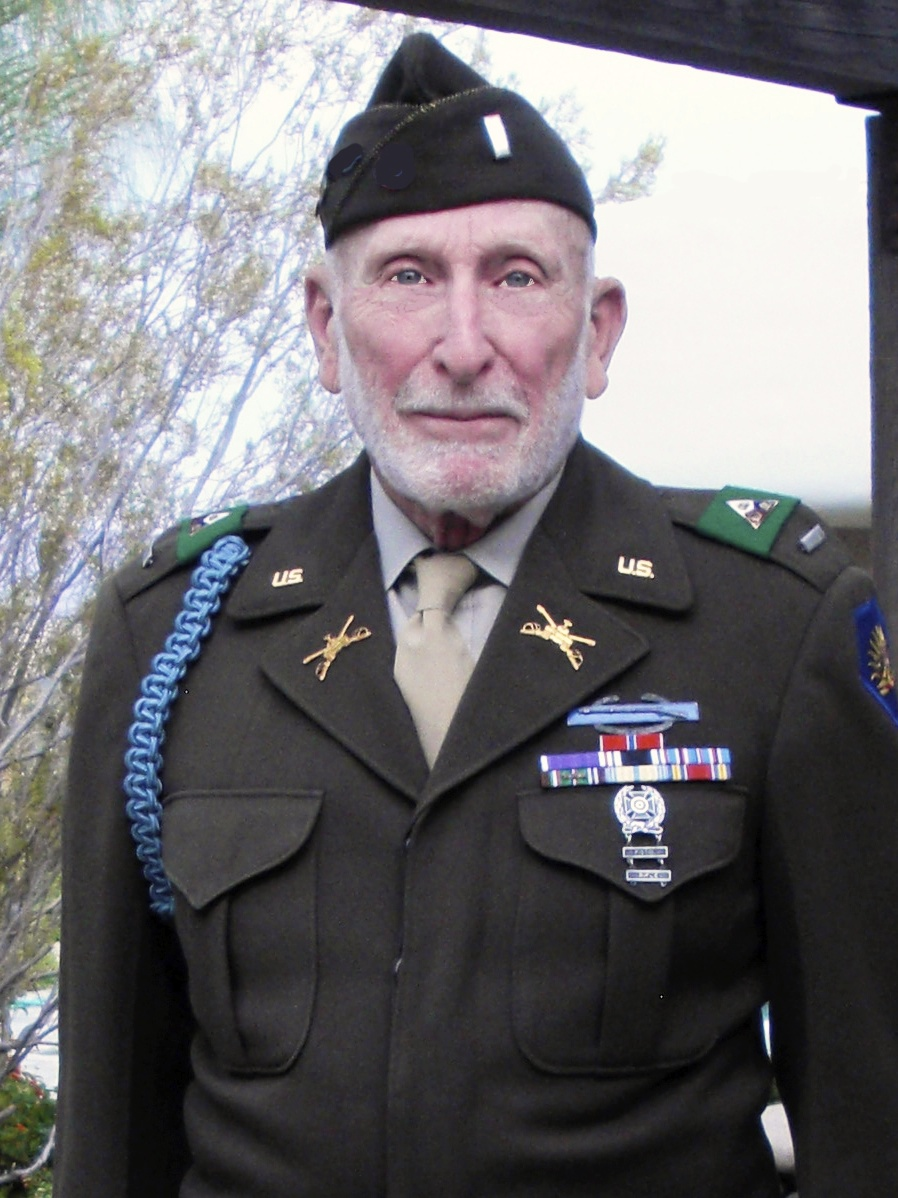
- Donald Prell in his WWII U.S. Army uniform, 2009
- Born: Donald B. Prell; July 7, 1924; Los Angeles, California, U.S.
- Died: July 28, 2020 (aged 96); Palm Springs, California, U.S.
- Military career
- Allegiance: United States of America
- Branch: United States Army
- Service years: 1942–1945 (active); 1945–1960 (reserve)
- Rank: First Lieutenant
- Unit: 106th Infantry Division
- Conflicts: World War II • Battle of the Bulge
- Awards: Bronze Star (2); Purple Heart; Prisoner of War Medal (2)

Donald B. Prell (July 7, 1924 – July 28, 2020) was an American World War II veteran, venture capitalist and futurist who created Datamation, the first magazine devoted solely to the computer hardware and software industry.

== Early life ==
Prell was born in Los Angeles, California, and graduated from Los Angeles High School in the summer of 1942. In his freshman year at UCLA, he enlisted in the US Army. In 1944, aged 19, he graduated from Officer Candidate School, Ft. Benning, Georgia, and was commissioned a 2nd Lieutenant, Infantry. Serving in the European Theater of Operations in command of the second platoon of the Anti-Tank Company, 422nd Regiment, 106th Division, during the Battle of the Bulge, December 16–19, 1944, he was wounded and captured. Captured at the same time as Prell was Richard Bordeaux Parker, who commanded the first platoon of the Anti-Tank Company.

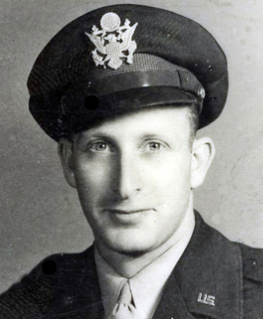
First Lieutenant Donald Prell 1946.

On March 27, 1945, he was briefly freed by Task Force Baum, a clandestine U.S. Army mission to liberate Oflag XIII-B authorized by General George S. Patton, then commanding the Third Army. The raid was a fiasco, with many POW casualties, including Patton's son-in-law, Lt. Colonel John K. Waters, who was seriously wounded. (Patton reported the raid as the only mistake he made during World War II and General Dwight D. Eisenhower reprimanded him for it.) Prell's freedom lasted only a few days as he was recaptured after attempting to locate friendly forces. A month later, he escaped from a POW camp south of Nuremberg, and found his way to freedom.

After the war, he resumed undergraduate studies at UCLA and graduated in 1948. While at UCLA, he was an active member of the American Veterans Committee, which was committed to integrating the U.S. military. Prell was involved with successfully ending racial discrimination of patrons at Oakley's Barbershop in Westwood. Prell was a Ph.D. candidate in Psychology with Hans Eysenck's Program Research Team at the University of London from 1948-1951. It was here that he learned to use Hollerith punched card tabulation machines, the forerunner of today's digital computers.

== Professional career ==
Whilst studying for his graduate degree at the University of London (1948–1950) he was employed as a Psychologist at the West Park Hospital, Epsom, Surrey. During the 1950s, Prell worked with Rand Corporation futurist Herman Kahn, who later founded the Hudson Institute in New York. In this period he was associated with many of the early designers of high-speed computer input-output devices, analog to digital converters, and digital display plotters, including working with Bernard Benson of the Benson-Lehner Corporation. In 1957, working with Thomson Publications, he created Datamation, the first magazine dedicated solely to the emerging computer-data-processing industry. In 1961, he was president, and the major shareholder, of Electro-Radiation, Inc, a Santa Monica, California firm specializing in molecular electronics and electroluminescence. Later, he founded and served as President of two venture capital firms: in 1967, Union Ventures (a subsidiary of the Union Bank N.A.) and, in 1980, Imperial Ventures (a subsidiary of Imperial Bank of California). During his association with Union Bank, whose CEO at the time was the banking innovator, Harry Volk, Prell was responsible for producing the bank's first and only 30-year Strategic Plan.

== Involvement with UCLA ==
In the 1980s, Prell founded, and was the first chairman of, the UCLA College of Letters and Science Dean's Council. Prell also served as a longtime member of the Chancellor's Associates during the tenure of Chancellor Charles E. Young, along with such friends and colleagues as Rafer Johnson and J.D. Morgan. He was a trustee of the UCLA Foundation and was also a president of the Order of the Blue Shield, an alumni group dedicated to furthering the interest and welfare of UCLA. The UCLA College of Letters and Science annually awards three scholarships on the basis of academic merit to UCLA undergraduate students in the name of Donald Prell and his wife, Bette Prell.

Prell received the UCLA University Service Award in 1977.

== Other interests ==
Over the course of his career Prell pursued long-standing interests in both Edward John Trelawny, a novelist and friend of Percy Bysshe Shelley and Lord Byron, and Pierre Laval, Prime Minister of France in the 1930s and again during the Vichy era. Both interests arose while living in England in the late 1940s; he discovered Trelawny's relationship to the romantic poets on a holiday to Cornwall, and he befriended René de Chambrun, Laval's son-in-law, in London. In the course of Prell's research, he authored four journal articles and six books and developed extensive collections of material by and about Trelawny and Laval. These research materials have been donated to two Southern California libraries:

- The Edward John Trelawny Collection, including one of the original notebooks of Edward Ellerker Williams, an associate of Shelley, is in the Special Collections of The Claremont Colleges Library, Claremont Colleges, Claremont, California.
- The Pierre Laval Collection resides in Special Collections of the UCR Libraries, University of California, Riverside, Riverside, California.

== Personal life ==
In 1960, Prell married Elizabeth (Bette) Howe, a British novelist and magazine editor. They had two children. He and his wife lived in Palm Springs, California from 1996. Prell appeared in a 2010 documentary about the life of Nico Minardos, a Greek-American actor, titled Finding Nico. Prell had been a longtime friend of Minardos.

== Death ==
Donald Prell died on July 28, 2020, at the age of 96, and was interred at the Los Angeles National Cemetery with full military honors.

== Legacy ==
Prell was posthumously inducted into the U.S. Army's Officer Candidate School Hall of Fame in 2021 for "valorous combat leadership and lifelong service to the nation." In December 2022, the Consulate General of France in Los Angeles disclosed that the Legion of Honour medal was authorized for Prell in 2019 for his service to the French Republic during World War II but the award was delayed due to COVID-19. Prell died before the award's presentation could be conducted at an in-person ceremony.

== Publications ==
- The Inheritance of Neuroticism: An Experimental Study, Hans. J. Eysenck and Donald B. Prell, The Journal of Mental Health, Volume XCVII, July, 1951, pp. 441–465
- Economic study of the Seychelles Islands, D. B. Prell. 1965,
- The Sinking of the Don Juan Revisited, Donald B. Prell, Keats-Shelley Journal, Volume LVI, 2007, pp. 136–154
- Discovering Byron's Boat (the Bolivar), Donald Prell, The Byron Journal, Volume 35, No.1, 2007, pp. 53–59
- The Untold Story of the Survival of the Penn Central Company, Donald B. Prell, Strand Publishing, 2003 Open Library
- Trelawny, Fact or Fiction, Donald B. Prell, Strand Publishing, 2008,
- Sailing With Byron from Genoa to Cephalonia, Donald B. Prell, Strand Publishing, 2009 Open Library
- Lord Byron --- Coincidence or Destiny, Donald B. Prell, Strand Publishing, 2009 Open Library
- Biography of Captain Daniel Roberts, Donald B. Prell, Strand Publishing, 2010 Open Library
- Karl Nolde, An Artist's Life, Donald B. Prell, Strand Publishing, 2015 Open Library

== Military medals and decorations ==
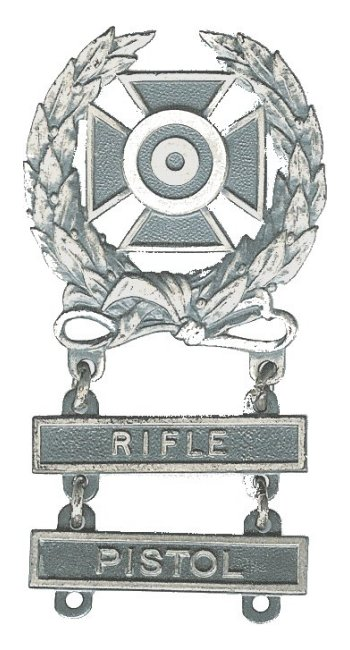

Badge	Combat Infantryman Badge		
1st row	Bronze Star with 1 bronze Oak leaf cluster (2 awards)		
2nd row	Purple Heart	Prisoner of War Medal with 1 bronze Service star (2 awards)	American Campaign Medal
3rd row	European-African-Middle Eastern Campaign Medal with 3 bronze Campaign stars	Armed Forces Reserve Medal	World War II Victory Medal
4th row	Legion of Honour – Chevalier authorized in 2019 but award delayed due to COVID-19		
Badge	Expert marksmanship badge with Rifle and Pistol Component Bars		
