= Stalag XIII-D =

Nazi POW camp in Nuremberg, Germany

- Nuremberg, Bavaria

Site information
- Type: Prisoner-of-war camp
- Controlled by: Nazi Germany

Location
- Nuremberg, Germany (pre-war borders, 1937)
- Coordinates: 49.4275°N 11.1225°E

Site history
- In use: 1940–1945

Garrison information
- Occupants: Allied POWs

Stalag XIII-D Nürnberg Langwasser was a German Army World War II prisoner-of-war camp built on what had been the Nazi party rally grounds in Nuremberg, northern Bavaria.

== Camp history ==
In September 1939 an internment camp for enemy civilians was created within the buildings of the Sturmabteilung camp at the rally grounds. Within a couple of months, the civilians were moved out and prisoners from the invasion of Poland arrived. From May 1940, after the invasion of Norway and the Battle of France, prisoners arrived in large numbers, until they totalled 150,000 from all occupied countries, except Britain. British prisoners were held in separate camps all over Germany. Part of the facilities were used as Oflag XIII-A for officers.

In this camp during August 1940, prisoners of war celebrated a "special Olympics" called International Prisoner-of-War Olympic Games where prisoners of Belgium, France, Great Britain, Norway, Poland, Russia and Yugoslavia took part.

In August 1940 most enlisted men were shipped to other camps: Stalag XIII-A, Stalag XIII-B and Stalag XIII-C. Only those remained who were already employed in local industry and were housed in individual Arbeitskommandos.

In June 1941 the massive influx of Soviet prisoners from Operation Barbarossa began. In August 1943 the camp was severely damaged during an Allied air-raid. 23 wooden huts were burnt down. Miraculously only two Soviet prisoners were killed in the camp. However, in this and subsequent bombing attacks, many prisoners were killed in individual Arbeitskommandos. In late 1944/early 1945 the camp population grew enormously with the arrival of prisoners evacuated from camps in the east in front of the advance of the Red Army. These included many Americans and British airmen from Stalag Luft III. On 12 April 1945 large numbers were marched to Stalag VII-A, and on 16 April the camp was liberated by advance elements of the United States Army.

== Post-war ==
After the war, former SS military personnel were held in Stalag XIII-D. It imprisoned 15,000 SS members. In 1946 there was an attempt to kill the SS prisoners, apparently by Abba Kovner's Jewish revenge organisation Nakam. A member of the group got a job as a baker and poisoned the bread to be fed to the prisoners. Large numbers were taken ill, but the actual death toll is not known.
