= Langwasser =

- Stadtteil of Nuremberg
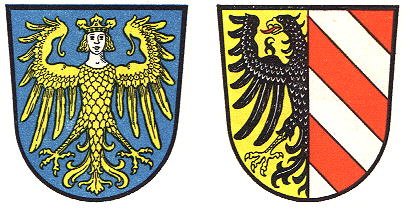
- Coat of arms
- Interactive map of Langwasser
- Location within Germany Location within Bavaria
- Coordinates: 49°24′N 11°7′E
- Country: Germany
- State: Bavaria
- Admin. region: Middle Franconia
- District: Urban district
- City: Nuremberg

Population (2019-12-31)
  - Total: 33,008
- Time zone: UTC+01:00 (CET)
  - Summer (DST): UTC+02:00 (CEST)
- Postal codes: 90470-90479
- Dialling codes: 0911
- Vehicle registration: N
- Website: bvlangwasser.de

"Plattenbau" housing complex, built in the 1970s in the southern end of Langwasser

Typical "Plattenbau" housing complex in northwestern Langwasser, built in the 1960s

Langwasser is a Stadtteil in the southeast of the German city of Nuremberg. It was developed as a prototype of the satellite town concept in the 1960s and is primarily a suburban residential area. The name Langwasser (translation: 'long water') comes from a small stream bordering the area on its eastern edge.

== Location ==
Langwasser is located in the southeastern area of the German city of Nuremberg and is part of the statistical area Südöstliche Außenstadt.

== History ==
At the beginning of the 20th century, the area that would become Langwasser was heavily wooded and part of the forest and former imperial estate of Nürnberger Reichswald. After devastating forest fires between 1917 and 1919, the area was cleared and used for farming.

=== Nazi era ===
Prior to World War II, the area that had been cleared by fire became an important site for the Nazi movement. Beginning in 1934, it was the site of various tent cities and encampments. The area originally housed a tent encampment of the Reich Labor Service (RAD) and later the Hitler Youth (HJ). Permanent camps for the SS, SA, HJ, and RAD were built near the Nuremberg rally grounds. The Langwasser camp, with space for 200,000, was the largest. At the outbreak of World War II, party rallies ceased, and the compound was converted into a prisoner-of-war camp known as Stalag XIII-D, which housed up to 150,000 prisoners until closing in 1940. In this camp, during August 1940, prisoners of war celebrated a "special Olympics" called International Prisoner-of-War Olympic Games, in which captives from Belgium, France, Great Britain, Norway, Poland, Russia, and Yugoslavia took part. United States military records report that 6,676 American POWs were transferred there late in the war.

=== Post-war period ===
The history of Langwasser as a district begins after the Second World War, in 1949. For ten years, the area was a mixture of refugee camps and temporary housing developments. Construction of the first permanent housing developments did not begin until the 1950s. Many German refugees from Silesia and the Sudetenland made Langwasser their new home.

The facilities were used as an internment camp by the US occupation army. During the Nuremberg trials, 21 witnesses—members of the SS—were moved from the Palace of Justice to the camp, on 17 July 1946.

=== Modern era ===
The modern history of Langwasser begins with the decision of the city of Nuremberg to develop a planned community in the area, marketed with the slogan "living in the country". An architectural competition was held in 1956, with construction beginning the following year. It was not fully completed until the 1990s.

== Public transportation ==
Langwasser is served by the Nuremberg U-Bahn, on the U1 line. The line terminal, Langwasser Süd, is one of five different U1 stations in the Stadtteil.
