= Danil Chaban =

Russian luger (born 1974)

Personal information
- Nationality: Russian
- Born: 8 July 1974 (age 51) Bratsk, Russia

Sport
- Sport: Luge

Danil Chaban (born 8 July 1974) is a Russian luger. He competed at the 1998 Winter Olympics, and the 2002 Winter Olympics.
