= Stalag XIII-C =

World War II German army-run prisoner of war camp

- Hammelburg, Bavaria

Site information
- Type: Prisoner-of-war camp
- Controlled by: Nazi Germany

Location
- Hammelburg, Germany (pre-war borders, 1937)
- Coordinates: 50.08416°N 9.90249°E

Site history
- In use: 1940–1945

Garrison information
- Occupants: c. 33,000 Allied POW

Stalag XIII-C (or Stammlager XIII C) was a German Army World War II prisoner-of-war camp (Stammlager) built on what had been the training camp at Hammelburg, Lower Franconia, Bavaria, Germany. The camp was about 3 kilometres (1.9 mi) south from the town. In 1943, the officer rank POWs were moved to nearby Oflag XIII-B camp.

== Camp history ==
Hammelburg was a large German Army training camp, set up in 1893. Part of this camp had been used as a POW camp for Allied army personnel in World War I. After 1935 it was a training camp and military training area for the newly reconstituted German Army.

In May 1940 the camp was established in wooden huts at the south end of the training ground. The first prisoners included Belgian, Dutch and French soldiers taken during the Battle of France. In May–June 1941 Yugoslavian, predominantly Serbian prisoners arrived from the Balkans Campaign, and soon after in June–July 1941 Australian and other British Commonwealth soldiers arrived, captured during the Battle of Crete. A strike against treatment conditions in early 1942 was suppressed.

In April 1943 Oflag XIII-B was opened nearby, with officers transferred from Oflag XIII-A at Nuremberg.

As was usual for stalags, many of the prisoners were located in Arbeitslager (labor camps) on farms or adjacent to factories or other industrial operations. Many locals in the area were of the Roman Catholic religion and reported to be anti-Hitler. Some soldiers were dispatched to work on dairy farms, and forestry or digging potatoes. It was estimated by December 1944 that 90% of POWs were engaged in agricultural work.

The stalag served as the base for distribution of International Red Cross packages and mail. A military hospital (German "Lazarett") cared for prisoners that were sick or had been injured in industrial accidents or air-raids. A number of enlisted men and NCOs were housed in the adjacent Oflag to provide necessary services.

Stalag XIII-C also saw Australia-Britain cricket matches, music concerts, and theatrical performances. Musical instruments included the accordion and lutes. The Australians also held a sports day on Anzac Day, April 1943, of football, rugby, cricket, and basketball. There was also an egg-and-spoon race, sack race, three-legged race, fill-the-bottle-by-mouth, and clog race, with participants additional to Australia from France, Poland, and Serbia. An October 1943 concert with 500 POWs in attendance saw artists from Belgium, France, Poland, Russia, Serbia, and Australia.

Basketball was an active camp activity in February 1944, with a competition between the Australian, French, and Polish POWs. In April 1944, some prisoners were transferred from Stalag XIII-C to Stalag 357. At this time it was estimated the camp size to be 30,000 prisoners, mostly Russians, but including Australian, British, French, New Zealanders, Polish, and Serbians.

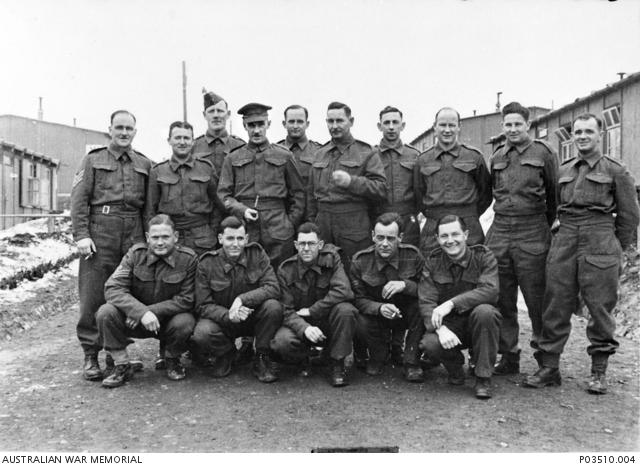
Australian POWs, 1942. RSM Brown, camp leader, in peak cap.

For the Armistice Day memorial service on 11 November 1943, there were 110 warrant officers and men of the Australian Imperial Force and British Expeditionary Force parading in three platoons.

June 1944 saw about 769 Australian POWs still in the camp, where they had recently raised £84 for the Australian Red Cross. Red Cross packages were very important to the comfort of soldiers, especially clothing from the cold. Initial arrival into the stalag saw rations of "thin soup and brown bread in very meagre quantities", and certainly by September 1943, where round-the-clock Allied bombing efforts in Germany also was contributing to "wholesale disorganisation and panic". YMCA gift packages were also being received, delivered by August 1944.

American soldiers who had been captured during the Battle of Normandy arrived in June–July 1944, and more from the Battle of the Bulge in January 1945. By December 1944 the camp was reported to hold 28,000 POWs, including 735 Australians. In March 1945 a large group of prisoners arrived in deplorable condition after marching the 500 miles (800 km) from Stalag VIII-D in severe winter conditions. The march into camp of 200 US soldiers saw seventeen having their frozen feet amputated with rudimentary instruments by Serbian and New Zealand Army doctors. The camp was liberated by Combat Command B of the US 14th Armored Division on 6 April 1945.

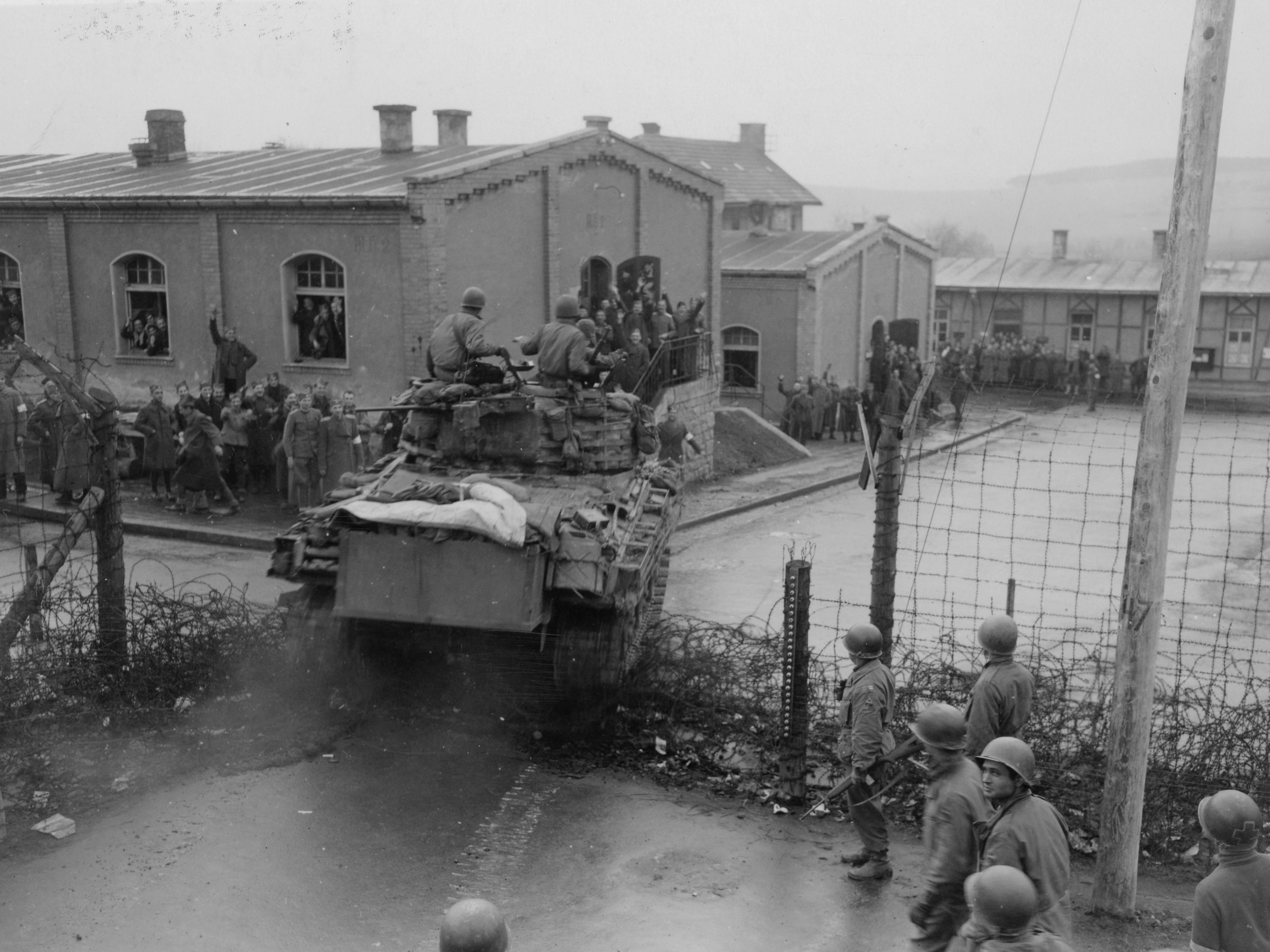
An M4 Sherman crashes through the camp's fence to liberate troops in April 1945. Yugoslav prisoners can be seen.

In April 1945, as Seventh Army US troops moved further into Germany and towards the camp, 4000–5000 British POWs alone liberated, while some prisoners from the camp had already been marched further to the east.

At least three Australian was buried at the camp, two by April 1943, and one by February 1945 when killed in an accident.

=== Camp leader (Australian forces) ===
Regimental sergeant major William Roderick 'Bill' Brown of the 2/11th Australian Infantry Battalion was the Red Cross representative, man of confidence, and camp leader, from August 1941 until the arrival of the liberating US forces on 9 April 1945. A "man of confidence" was elected by the other prisoners and approved by the camp commandant; documents signed by him is accepted by British courts. He organised many events within the camp, and wrote to Australian newspapers.

Captured in the Crete action by German paratroopers in June 1941, he was transferred to POW Stalag XIII-C by October 1941. After release from the stalag, he went to the Pacific Theatre. Brown was awarded the Australian Efficiency Medal, became a Member of the British Empire (MBE) on 1 February 1946 – for gallant and distinguished services whilst POW – and awarded the US Bronze Star on 13 April 1946. Born in October 1900 in Perth, Scotland, he died in 1961, aged 60, in Perth, Western Australia.

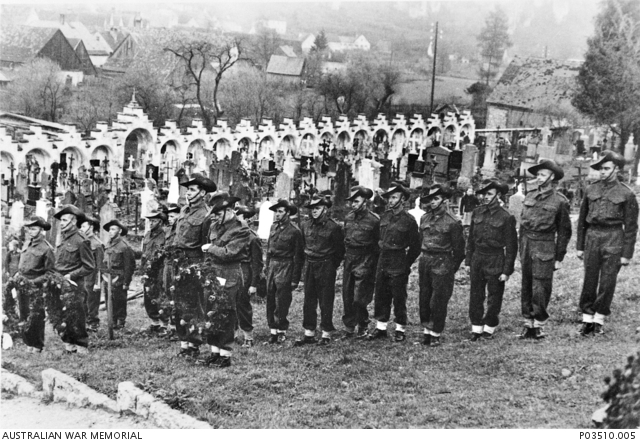
Allied POWs attending the funeral of a serviceman at the cemetery, 1941.

== Post-war ==
In November 1947, 63 mass graves containing 13,000 Allied POWs was found in woods near Hammelburg, including those from Australia, Belgium, Britain, France, Italy, and Yugoslavia. One grave alone had 11,000 Russians. The graves were found by the International Refugees' Organisation when checking old records, discovering about 23,000 of the stalag's prisoner records were missing. The graveyard, now a war cemetery (Kriegsgräberstätte), is south of the camp, on Bonnlanderstrasse, backing onto the present military firing range. All British, Commonwealth, French, and Italian internments have been repatriated.

After the war, one Yorkshire soldier emigrated to Australia after a behest of Australian POWs, and another Australian POW married a local German woman who smuggled him food.

The site, Lager Hammelburg, is now home to the German Infantry School (Deutsche Infanterieschule). Some building used at the time of the camp are still in use by 2023.

== In television ==
The 1960s and 1970s American television program Hogan's Heroes was situated in a fictitious POW camp called "Luft-Stalag 13" located near Hammelburg, likely based on actual Luftwaffe POW camps administered by them for Allied POW combat pilots and aircrew shot down over German territory. However, there was no resemblance to the actual Stalags XIII-A, -B or -C other than name and location.

The Masters of the Air TV-series released in 2024 sets its concluding episode in Stalag XIII.

== See also ==
- List of prisoner-of-war camps in Germany
- Oflag XIII-B, the officers POW camp, adjoining Stalag XIII-C
