= 14th Armored Division (United States) =

- 14th Armored Division shoulder sleeve insignia
- Active: 9 June 1942–16 September 1945
- Country: United States
- Branch: United States Army
- Type: Armor
- Role: Armored warfare
- Size: Division
- Nickname: "Liberators" (special designation)
- Engagements: World War II; Rhineland; Ardennes-Alsace; Central Europe

Insignia
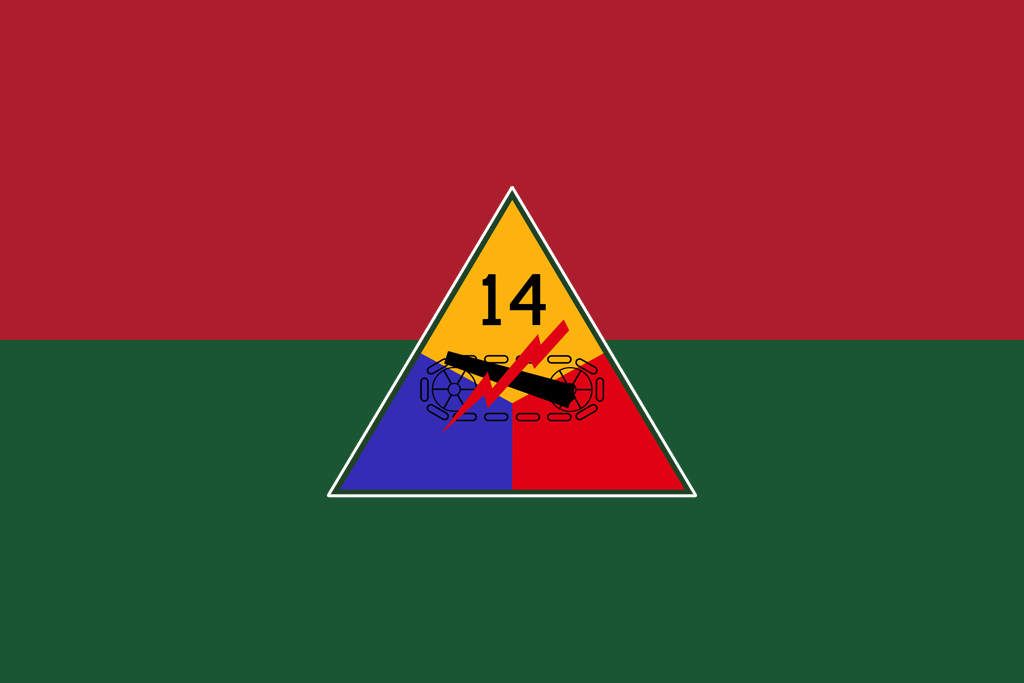
- Flag of the United States Army 14th Armored Division

The 14th Armored Division was an armored division of the United States Army assigned to the Seventh Army of the Sixth Army Group during World War II. It remains on the permanent roll of the Regular Army as an inactive division, and is eligible for reactivation. The division is officially nicknamed the "Liberators".

== History ==
The 14th Armored Division was constituted and added to the roll of the US Army on 28 August 1942; it was activated in the Army of the United States on 15 November in a ceremony at Camp Chaffee, Arkansas. It was organized initially as a heavy division with two armored regiments (the 47th and 48th) and one armored infantry regiment, the 62nd Infantry Regiment. It was reorganized from a heavy division to a light division on 20 September 1943. The reorganization saw the loss of two tank battalions from the Armored regiments, one battalion each. The 1st Battalion of the 47th Armor was redesignated as the 786th Tank Battalion and the 3rd Battalion of the 48th Armor was redesignated as the 716th Tank Battalion.

The division departed Camp Chaffee in November to participate in the 2nd Army maneuvers in Tennessee from 17 November 1943 until 10 January 1944. At the conclusion of the exercise, the division was assigned to Camp Campbell, Kentucky. The division remained at Camp Campbell until late September when it was alerted for movement to the ETO (European Theater of Operations) via Camp Shanks, New York where it went for final processing. Units departed Camp Campbell on 1 October and completed their arrival at Camp Shanks on the 6th of that month. After completing their processing, the division boarded four transport ships for deployment on 13 October 1944.

=== France and the Alsatian Plain ===
The 14th Armored Division landed at Marseille in southern France, on 29 October 1944. Within two weeks some of its elements were in combat, maintaining defensive positions along the Franco-Italian frontier. The division was assigned to US 6th Army Group on 1 November. On 10 November, the division was assigned to US Seventh Army. On 12 November the Combat Command Reserve (CCR) was detached, and ordered to the Maritime Alps by 6th Army Group to relieve units in defensive positions there. On 15 November, Combat Command A moved north from the area of Marseille to Épinal to take part in the VI Corps drive through the Vosges Mountains, and was followed by Combat Command B five days later. Hard fighting at Gertwiller, Benfeld, and Barr helped VI Corps to crack the German defenses, the division was on the Alsatian Plain in early December. On 17 December the division attacked across the Lauter River into Germany itself, along with the other units of VI Corps, it fought its way into a heavily defended portion of the German Westwall. Due to the growing crisis in the Ardennes, General Eisenhower, the supreme commander, ordered the Seventh Army to stop its attack and withdraw from the Westwall, where its units assumed positions south of the Lauter River. The order was poorly timed as elements of the 14th Armored Division had penetrated deep into the German defenses, and were poised to break out into the enemy's rear.

=== Operation Nordwind ===
==== Task Force Hudelson ====
On 25 December 1944 VI Corps ordered the division's Combat Command R, commanded by Colonel Daniel Hudelson, to assemble a regimental-sized task force (TF Hudelson), to establish defensive positions along a 10-mile section of the Seventh Army line linking XV and VI Corps. It was located in the rugged Vosges Mountains in the area of Bannstein in France, southeast of Saarbrücken. The balance of the division was placed in Corps Reserve to protect against a Saar Valley penetration by the Germans. Additionally, it was ordered to be prepared to move to the vicinity of Phalsbourg as a counter-attacking force to stop and prevent a break-through in the XV Corps area.

TF Hudelson consisted of the division's 62nd Armored Infantry Battalion, the 94th Cavalry Reconnaissance Squadron and Company A of the 125th Armored Engineer Battalion. TF Hudelson was further reinforced by two VI Corps units, the 117th Cavalry Reconnaissance Squadron and the 1st Battalion, 540th Combat Engineers. Just before midnight on New Year's Eve 1944, the German Army Group G launched Operation Nordwind, the last major German counter-offensive of the war. The advancing German units were from the XC and LXXXIX Corps, attacking through the Low Vosges. TF Hudleson held only a thin line of strong points and screens. During the night and day of 1 January 1945, TF Hudelson found itself engaged by elements of five enemy divisions, the 256th, 257th, 361st and 559th Volksgrenadier. Just after midnight on the 1st, the 62nd Armored Infantry reported "enemy attack across the entire front of our battalion zone. The main effort by enemy being made on battalion left flank in the sector of C Co, by estimated 2000 Infantry supported by five (5) Mark IV tanks". The troops of TF Hudelson took the brunt of the German advance which had penetrated to Bannstein by day-break. The Task Force was soon overrun or bypassed by the German divisions but it managed to delay and slow the German advance until substantial reinforcements could arrive and stem the German advance. By the fourth day of the German counter-offensive it had advanced 10 miles. With pressure building during the first day of the attack, aerial observation reported a strong regimental size element moving towards Bannstein. Reinforcements were sent to Baerenthal to reinforce the VI Corps left flank and the 14th Armored Division was ordered to establish blocking positions. On 2 January, the 45th Division along with the attached Task Force, occupied positions to block any further penetration by the Germans. This allowed for the relief of Task Force Hudelson and its return to division control.

The major fighting between 1 and 8 January occurred in the Vosges Mountains and two combat commands of the division were in almost continuous action against the German thrusts. With the failure of his attack in the Vosges, the enemy attempted to break through to Hagenau and threaten Strasbourg and the Saverne Gap by attacks at Hatten and Rittershoffen, two small villages located side by side on the Alsatian Plain. However, this, the strongest attack of Operation Nordwind, was halted by the 14th Armored in the fierce defensive Battle of Hatten-Rittershoffen which ranged from 9 to 21 January 1945.

==== Hatten and Rittershoffen ====
As the fighting in the VI Corps sector intensified, the Germans committed the 21st Panzer and the 25th Panzer Grenadier Divisions to the attack with a breakthrough to Hagenau. On 9 January, German armor was able to penetrate the center of the VI Corps sector. This caused Brooks, the Corps commander, to commit his final reserve force, the 14th Armored, in an effort to stop the German XXXIX Panzer Corps advance. Ordered to take up positions in the vicinity of Hatten and Rittershoffen, the 14th assumed command and control of units from the 242nd Infantry Regiment and the 2nd and 3rd Battalions of the 315th Infantry Regiment, 79th Infantry Division . With heavy fighting in and around the towns, success was measured in how many buildings were controlled by each side as the Americans controlled the western half of the villages and the Germans the eastern half. On 15 January, the Germans strengthened the forces in both villages with elements of the 20th Parachute Regiment from the 7th Parachute Division, and the 104th Infantry Regiment from the 47th Volksgrenadier Division. As the fighting raged, the 14th Armored found itself increasingly on the defensive with Combat Command A holding Rittershoffen and Combat Command Reserve defending positions in and around Hatten. Combat Command B took up defensive positions behind the Rittershoffen to Leiterswiller road.

The resupply of the division was becoming very difficult due to the constant reorganizing of forces, the evacuation of the wounded and the shrinking perimeter. Gasoline, of which almost 200,000 U.S. gallons (760,000 liters) was consumed in seven days, had to come from near Saverne 35 miles (55 kilometers) away along icy roads in blackout conditions. Mortar ammunition had run out by 15 January and the Division's G-4 notified the advanced command post that no more might be available for two weeks. Instructions were given for all abandoned German 8 cm mortar ammunition to be picked up and a method was devised by the Division ammunition officer to use this in American 81 mm mortars. Artillery ammunition was strictly rationed after 15 January when 6,247 rounds of ammunition were expended out of a total of nearly 40,000 rounds for the entire seven days. In order to alleviate the shortage a convoy of twenty 2 1/2-short-ton (2.3-tonne) trucks were sent to Marseilles and returned loaded with ammunition dug out of the surf and the landing sites for the invasion of Southern France. Artillery was further handicapped by the shortage of telephone wire. Poor visibility hampered air operations on both sides for most days. On 15 January the first German jet propelled aircraft was seen in the area bombing a battery of the 499th Armored Field Artillery Battalion.

Approximately 39 American and 51 German tanks were destroyed, damaged or abandoned. Recovery of disabled vehicles was very difficult due to the complete lack of cover. Following the battle, the division's G-4 (staff officer) reported to the commanding officer that the division was still short of 62 medium tanks despite having received over 60 replacements during the month of January. The 136th Ordnance Maintenance Battalion's report for the month listed approximately 150 tanks that had been knocked out in combat, repaired and returned to the division's tank battalions. An example of this is seen in the operational reports of the 47th and 48th Tank Battalions. At the height of the fighting the 47th reported that it had a total of 17 operational tanks out of an authorized strength of 50, all were committed to holding its portion of the line. The 48th Tank Battalion report for the same period included the comment that its tank companies were now of approximately squad strength.

The Division sustained battle casualties amounting to 104 killed, 899 wounded and 112 missing. German losses were estimated at in excess of 3,100 in total. The problem of obtaining infantry and armored replacement personnel, especially combat junior officers, was critical.

The Division's 11-day stand at Hatten and Rittershoffen allowed the VI Corps and Seventh Army to withdraw to prepared defensive positions. On 21 January, after the rest of Seventh Army had withdrawn to the south bank of the Moder River, the 14th and its supporting units withdrew from Hatten and Rittershoffen and moved south to join the rest of the army.

Lieutenant-General Jacob L. Devers, commanding general, 6th Army Group later commented that the Battle of Hatten-Rittershoffen "was one of the greatest defensive battles of the war." Units of the 14th Armored Division were nominated for four Presidential Unit Citations for its actions at Hatten-Rittershofen. Of these, two were awarded. Col. Hans von Luck, who commanded the 21st Panzer Division at Hatten-Rittershoffen wrote in his memoirs "Panzer Commander" that the battle ".... was one of the hardest and most costly battles that had ever raged on the western front." These are strong, telling words from a professional German panzer officer who had fought with Rommel's famed Afrika Korps in North Africa, served two tours of duty on the Eastern Front, and led the only armored counter-attack to be attempted against the Allied beachhead in Normandy. A veteran officer who served on the staff of Army Group G during the battle wrote after the war that the American defense of the town against overwhelming odds was "heroic."

After rest, rehabilitation and defensive missions during February and early March, the division returned to the offensive on 15 March 1945; it drove across the Moder River, cracked through the Siegfried Line and by the end of the month, had captured Germersheim on the Rhine River. On Easter Sunday, 1 April, the 14th moved across the Rhine near Worms, protecting the long left flank of the Seventh Army and advanced against moderate to heavy opposition through Lohr, Gemunden, Neustadt, and Hammelburg where, on 6 April, Combat Command B (CCB) liberated Stalag XIII-C and the more famous Oflag XIII-B.

=== Capture of Oflag XIIIB and Stalag XIIIC ===
After erecting a pontoon bridge near Worms across the Rhine on 1 April, the 14th attacked to the northeast with CCB in the lead. The initial task of CCB was to break through the Spessart Forest and into the rear of the German forces. The command advanced 75 miles on the first day with the lead elements reaching the town of Lohr. Approaching the town, the leading elements came under heavy small arms fire. As the infantry dismounted to clear the resistance, they and the tanks of the 47th Tank battalion experienced heavy antitank fire. The 47th lost three tanks due to the Panzerfaust.

Clearing the town, CCB continued its advance along the Main River through Sackenbach, Nantenbach (north east of Lohr) and Gemunden. As the columns continued along this route, they continued to receive heavy machine gun and mortar fire. On 6 April 1945, CCB's objective was the military layer south of Hammelburg and the POW camps to the south. The operational plan called for the 47th Tank battalion to advance from the north and the 19th Armored Infantry battalion to block and secure the roads to the south and east of the camps. As the units approached the camps, they came under sporadic fire from German machine guns. Entering the German lager, the infantrymen of the 19th found the prison gates and forced an opening into Oflag XIII-B where they found a large contingent of Serbian and American officer prisoners.

Elements of the 47th Tank battalion and the 94th Armored Reconnaissance battalion continued to the south and liberated Stalag XIII-C which held a large contingent of Allied enlisted men - American, Australians, British and others.

=== Capture of Stalag VII-A ===
Following the Battle of Nuremberg, the division raced to the Danube, crossing the river at Ingolstadt and passed through the 86th Infantry Division. Its mission was to secure crossings sites on the Isar River and to push on to Moosburg and Landshut. Advancing on a south easterly axis, CCA was on the division's right with CCR on the left and CCB in reserve. Facing the division were remnants of the 17th SS Panzer Grenadier and the 719th Infantry Divisions. After fighting their way across the Isar and into Moosburg, CCA entered the town on 29 April, approached Stalag VII-A and took the surrender of the camp garrison of over 200 men. Initial reports had listed the number of prisoners liberated as 27,000. This was wrong, there were over 130,000 Allied prisoners liberated from Stalag VII-A, the largest prisoner of war camp in Germany. The division rapidly moved eastward to the area of Mühldorf am Inn where it established two strong bridgeheads across the Inn River before being ordered to halt by III Corps. The division fired its last rounds on 2 May 1945. It was processing prisoners of war and patrolling its area when the war in Europe ended on 8 May.

=== Liberation of forced labor and concentration camps ===
During the divisions' advance into southern Germany, on 2 and 3 May, the 14th liberated several sub-camps of the Dachau concentration camp. Upon entering the towns of Mühldorf and Ampfing, units of the division discovered three large forced labor camps containing thousands of Polish and Soviet civilians. Units also liberated two additional camps nearby holding Jewish prisoners.

=== CCR Rifle Company ===
As a result of the shortage of infantry replacements which the European Theater was facing in late 1944, a call for volunteers was distributed throughout the communication zone for those willing to retrain as infantry replacements. This call was accepted by over 4,000 African American soldiers serving in support units. By 1 February 1945, 2,800 of these volunteers received orders to report to a retraining center where they received basic instruction in infantry skills and tactics. In March 1945, the first contingent of soldiers, organized into 12 platoons, were assigned to the 7th Army which organized them into three companies of four platoons each. They were organized as 7th Army Provisional Rifle Companies 1, 2 and 3 and then assigned to the 12th Armored Division. In late March, the last contingent of four additional platoons were assigned to 7th Army which organized them as the 7th Army Provisional Rifle Company 4 and then assigned them to the 14th Armored Division.

This 240-man company was assigned to the division without a command and control element, the division was also required to staff, arm and equip it. The division, with the assistance of Corps and Army support, was able to provide the company with its basic needs for future operations. Initially, the company was attached to the 19th Armored Infantry Battalion but it was then reassigned to CCR where it became known as the CCR Rifle Company. The troops came without officers and the 14th had to provide it with officers and non-commissioned officers. This outfit was mainly employed as an attachment to the 25th Tank Battalion. The company's first combat engagement took place near Lichtenfels, but it was near Bayreuth that the company received the accolade of approval from those that fought within the 14th Armored Division. In small platoon-size actions, CCR Rifle fought their way into Gottsfeld and Creussen helping to secure the towns. The company, when employed in less than company size, performed well. When employed as a company, the results were less satisfactory. This was a result of the way in which the companies were formed and trained, as platoons and not as a company. The unit remained with the division when it was reassigned to 3rd Army and ended the war with the 14th Armored. It was disbanded on 4 June 1945.

== Nickname ==
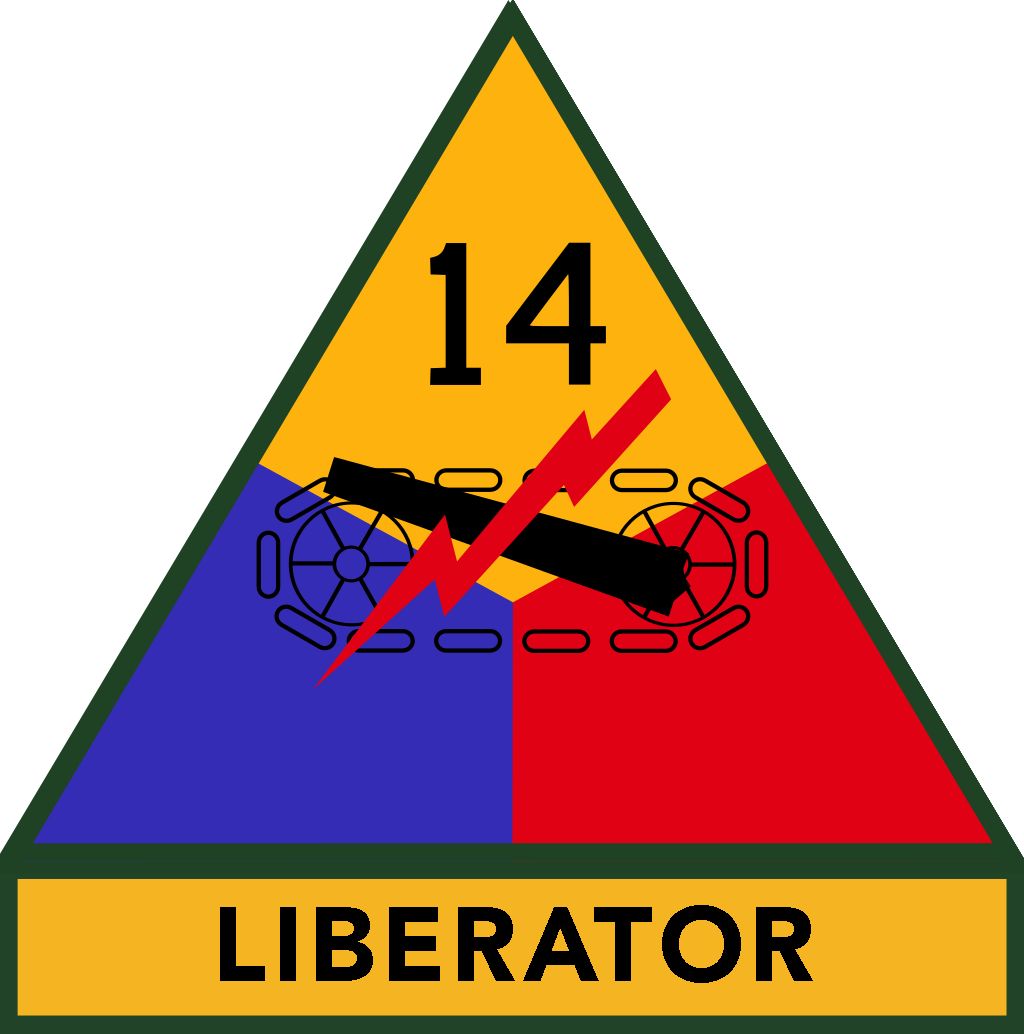
14th Armored Division "Liberator" Insignia

"Liberators" is the official nickname of the US 14th Armored Division. The division became known by its nickname during the last days of World War II when it liberated some 200,000 Allied prisoners of war from German prison camps. Among those liberated were approximately 20,000 American soldiers, sailors and airmen, as well as an estimated 40,000 troops from Great Britain and the Commonwealth.

The 14th Armored Division was inactivated on 16 September 1945 at Camp Patrick Henry, Virginia.

== Division organization ==
=== Heavy armored division ===
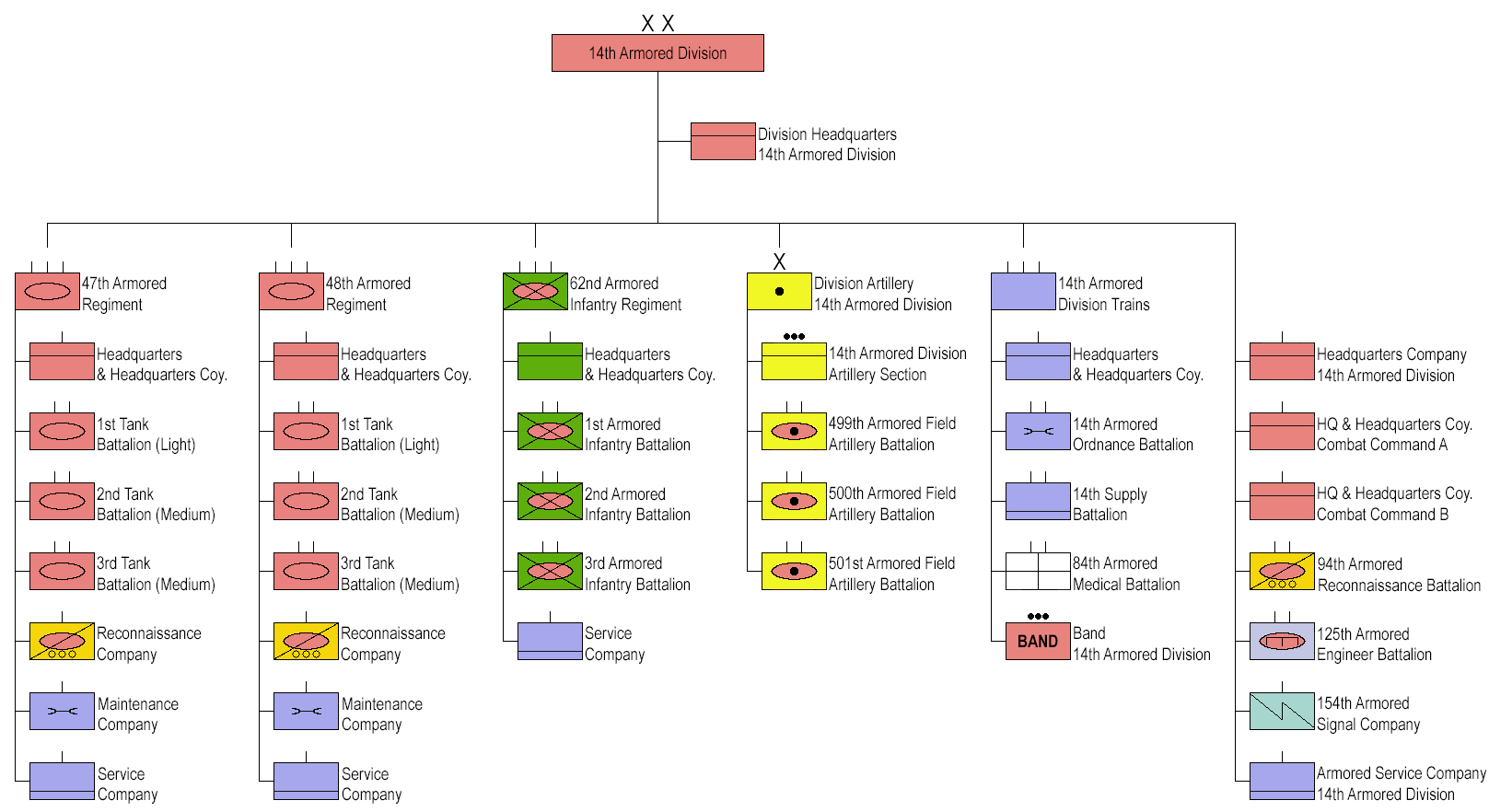
14th Armored Division organization after the division's activation (click to enlarge)

The division was activated as a heavy armored division in 1942. At the time the 14th Armored Division was composed of the following units:

- 14th Armored Division
  - Division Headquarters
  - Headquarters Company, 14th Armored Division
  - Headquarters and Headquarters Company, Combat Command A
  - Headquarters and Headquarters Company, Combat Command B
  - 154th Armored Signal Company
  - Armored Service Company (includes the division's Military Police Platoon)
  - 47th Armored Regiment (transferred from the 3rd Armored Division)
    - Headquarters and Headquarters Company
    - Reconnaissance Company (M3 scout cars and T30 HMC self propelled guns)
    - Maintenance Company
    - Service Company
    - 1st Tank Battalion (Light)
      - Headquarters and Headquarters Company
      - 3× Light Tank companies (A, B, C) (M3/M5 Stuart light tanks)
    - 2nd Tank Battalion (Medium)
      - Headquarters and Headquarters Company
      - 3× Medium Tank companies (D, E, F) (M4 Sherman tanks)
    - 3rd Tank Battalion (Medium)
      - Headquarters and Headquarters Company
      - 3× Medium Tank companies (G, H, I) (M4 Sherman tanks)
  - 48th Armored Regiment
    - same organization as 47th Armored Regiment
  - 62nd Armored Infantry Regiment
    - Headquarters and Headquarters Company
    - 3× Armored infantry battalions
      - each battalion consists of: 1× Headquarters and Headquarters Company, 3× Rifle companies on M3 half-tracks
    - Service Company
  - 94th Armored Reconnaissance Battalion
    - Headquarters and Headquarters Company
    - 3× Reconnaissance companies (M3 scout cars)
    - Light Tank Company (M3/M5 Stuart light tanks)
  - 125th Armored Engineer Battalion
    - Headquarters and Headquarters Company
    - 4× Armored engineer companies
    - Bridge Company
  - 14th Armored Division Artillery
    - 14th Armored Division Artillery Section
    - 499th Armored Field Artillery Battalion
      - Headquarters and Headquarters Battery
      - 3× Field artillery batteries (M7 Priest self propelled howitzers)
      - Service Battery
    - 500th Armored Field Artillery Battalion
      - same organization as 499th Armored Field Artillery Battalion
    - 501st Armored Field Artillery Battalion
      - same organization as 499th Armored Field Artillery Battalion
  - 14th Armored Division Trains
    - Headquarters and Headquarters Company
    - 14th Armored Ordnance Battalion
      - Headquarters and Headquarters Company
      - 3× Maintenance companies
    - 14th Supply Battalion
      - Headquarters and Headquarters Company
      - 2× Truck companies
    - 84th Armored Medical Battalion
      - Headquarters and Headquarters Company
      - 3× Medical companies
    - 14th Armored Division Band

=== Light armored division ===
Early in 1943, the Army Ground Force began a series of studies to reorganize the various divisions within the Army. After reviewing the tables of organization and after allowing the various commands to review and comment on the proposed restructure, the War Department published on 15 September 1943 a new armored division tables of organization. The restructuring removed the two armored regiments and armored infantry regiment from the table of organization and replaced them with three tank battalions and three armored infantry battalions. Each tank battalion included one light and three medium tank companies. Both Combat Commands, A and B, remained, but an additional Reserve Command was added to the organization. This was a small headquarters element of 10 personnel tasked to clarify command and control in the division's rear area. Armored engineer battalions lost their bridge companies, while their engineer companies were reduced from four to three. The division's cavalry reconnaissance squadron was increased in size to include an HQ Troop, four reconnaissance troops, a light tank company, and an assault gun troop of four platoons (one for each reconnaissance troop). Within the division trains, the division lost its supply battalion and the division's armored service company. These changes pared the division's strength from 14,630 men to 10,937, slashed the number of tanks from 360 to 263, reduced the variety of vehicles to ease repair problems, and eliminated the maintenance-prone motorcycles.

After its reorganization as a light armored division the 14th Armored Division was composed of the following units:

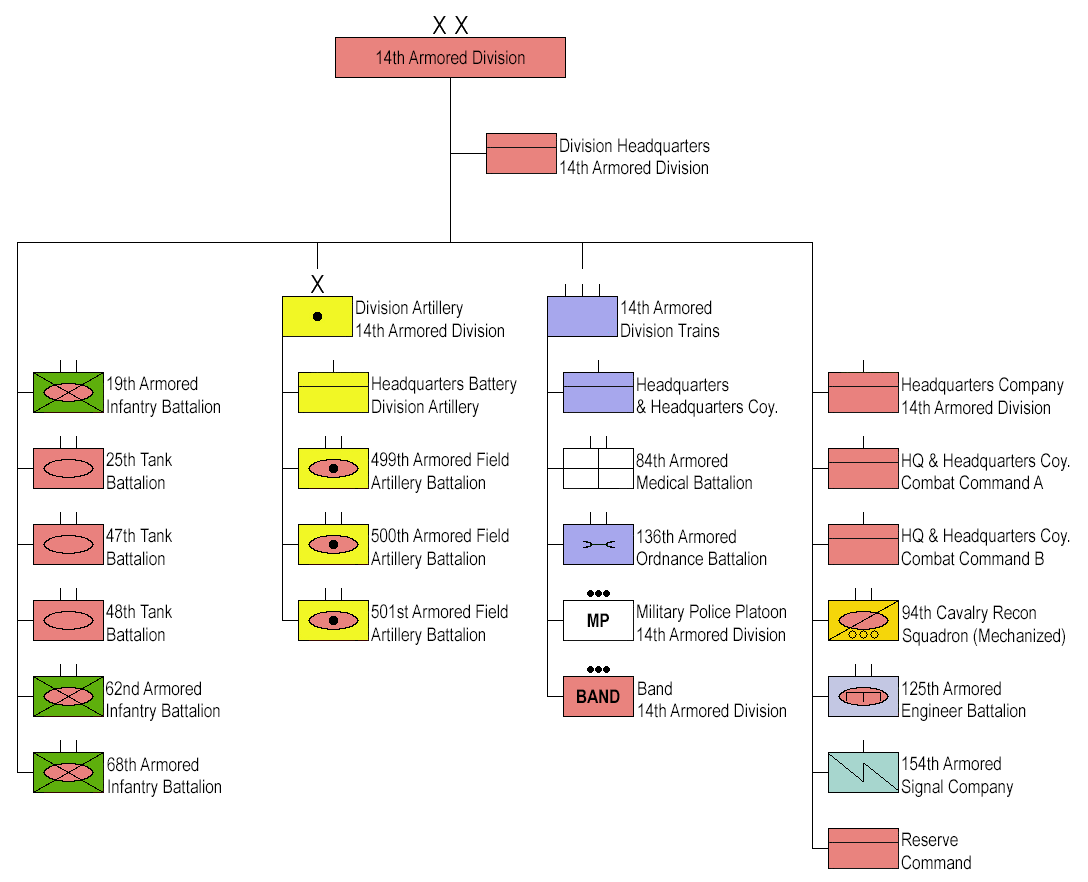
14th Armored Division organization after the division's reorganization (click to enlarge)

- 14th Armored Division
  - Division Headquarters
  - Headquarters Company, 14th Armored Division
  - Headquarters and Headquarters Company, Combat Command A
  - Headquarters and Headquarters Company, Combat Command B
  - 154th Armored Signal Company
  - Reserve Command
  - 25th Tank Battalion
    - Headquarters and Headquarters Company
    - 3× Medium Tank companies (M4 Sherman tanks)
    - Light Tank Company (M3/M5 Stuart or M24 Chaffee light tanks)
    - Service Company
  - 47th Tank Battalion
    - same organization as 25th Tank Battalion
  - 48th Tank Battalion
    - same organization as 25th Tank Battalion
  - 19th Armored Infantry Battalion
    - Headquarters and Headquarters Company
    - 3× Rifle companies (M3 half-tracks)
    - Service Company
  - 62nd Armored Infantry Battalion
    - same organization as 19th Armored Infantry Battalion
  - 68th Armored Infantry Battalion
    - same organization as 19th Armored Infantry Battalion
  - 94th Cavalry Reconnaissance Squadron (Mechanized)
    - Headquarters and Headquarters and Service Troop
    - 4× Cavalry reconnaissance troops (M8 Greyhound armored cars)
    - Cavalry Assault Gun Troop (M8 Scott self propelled guns)
    - Light Tank Company (M3/M5 Stuart or M24 Chaffee light tanks)
  - 125th Armored Engineer Battalion
    - Headquarters and Headquarters Company
    - 3× Armored engineer companies
  - 14th Armored Division Artillery
    - Headquarters and Headquarters Battery
    - 499th Armored Field Artillery Battalion
      - Headquarters and Headquarters Battery
      - 3× Field artillery batteries (M7 Priest self propelled howitzers)
      - Service Battery
    - 500th Armored Field Artillery Battalion
      - same organization as 499th Armored Field Artillery Battalion
    - 501st Armored Field Artillery Battalion
      - same organization as 499th Armored Field Artillery Battalion
  - 14th Armored Division Trains
    - Headquarters and Headquarters Company
    - 84th Armored Medical Battalion
      - Headquarters and Headquarters Company
      - 3× Medical companies
    - 136th Armored Ordnance Battalion
      - Headquarters and Headquarters Company
      - 3× Maintenance companies
    - Military Police Platoon
    - 14th Armored Division Band

Attached units:

- 398th AAA AW Battalion (SP) (15 Nov 1944 – 12 May 1945)
- 395th Quartermaster Truck Company
- 636th Tank Destroyer Battalion (SP) (28 Mar 1945 – 23 April 1945)

== Commanders ==
- Major General Vernon Prichard (Aug 1942 – Sep 1944)
- Major General Albert C. Smith (Sep 1944 to Inactivation)

== Awards and statistics ==
=== Casualties ===
- Total battle casualties: 2,690
- Killed in action: 505
- Wounded in action: 1,955
- Missing in action: 18
- Prisoner of war: 212

=== Distinguished Unit Citations ===
- 3rd Platoon, Troop C, and Troop E, 94th Armored Reconnaissance Squad
- 1st Platoon, Company A, 48th Tank Battalion

=== Individual awards ===
- Medal of Honor - 1 (Pfc. George B. Turner)
- Distinguished Service Cross - 9
- Silver Star - 273
- Legion of Merit - 8
- Soldier's Medal - 13
- Bronze Star Medal - 3,024
- Air Medal - 47

== External links and further reading ==
- Official Website of the 14th Armored Division
- See: Clarke and Smith, From The Riviera To The Rhine and The Seventh Army Report of Operations in France and Germany, 1944–1945 for a definitive description of Operation Nordwind and the 14th Armored Division's actions.
- Cirillo, Roger. The Ardennes-Alsace. The U.S. Army Campaigns of World War II. United States Army Center of Military History. CMH Pub 72-26. Archived from the original on 6 December 2008.
- See: Committee 1, Armor Officer Advance Course, The Armor School, Battle of Hatten Rittershoffen: 14th Armored Division, 12–20 January 1945,1950, Combined Arms Research Library, Fort Leavenworth, KS
- See: After Action Report, 62nd Armored Infantry Battalion, 14th Armor Division, Jan thru Apr 1945, Combined Arms Research Library, Fort Leavenworth, KS
- See: After Action Report, 47th Tank Battalion, 14th Armored Division, Dec 44 thru May 45, Combined Arms Research Library, Fort Leavenworth, KS
- See: After Action Report, 48th Tank Battalion, 14th Armored Division, Nov 44 thru Apr 45, Combined Arms Research Library, Fort Leavenworth, KS
- See: After Action Report, 84th Armored Medical Battalion, 14th Armored Division, Jan thru Apr 45, Combined Arms Research Library, Fort Leavenworth, KS
