= Oflag =

German prisoner of war camp in WW1 and WW2

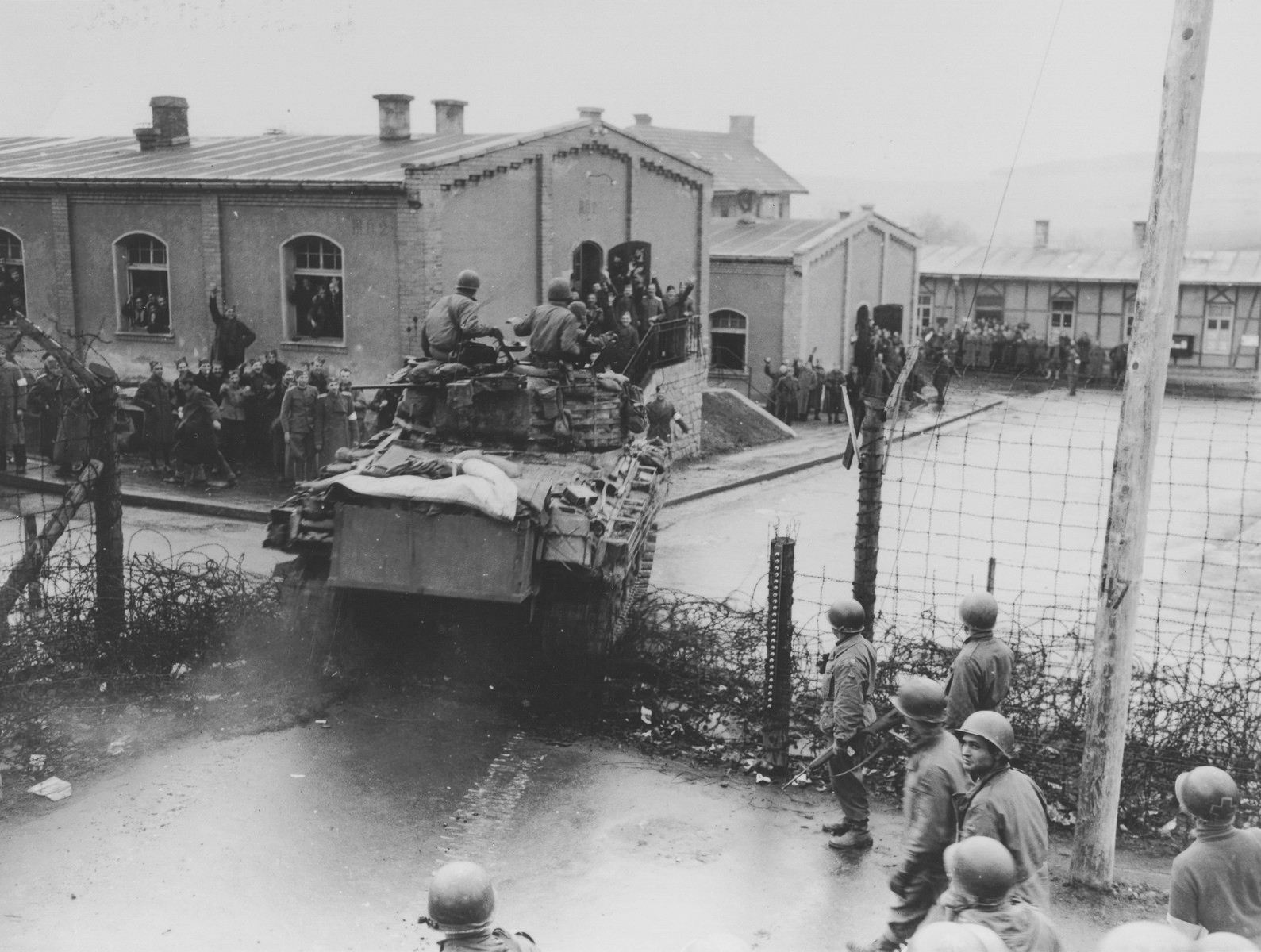
An M4 medium tank of the 47th Tank Bn., 14th Armored Division (U.S.) crashes through the fence of Oflag XIII-B, 6 April 1945

An Oflag (from German: Offizierslager) was a type of prisoner of war camp for officers which the German Army established in World War I in accordance with the requirements of the 1899 Hague Convention, and in World War II in accordance with the requirements of the Geneva Convention (1929).

Although officers were not required to work, at Oflag XIII-B (Hammelburg) when the POWs asked to be able to work for more food, they were told the Geneva Convention forbade them from working. In some Oflags a limited number of non-commissioned soldiers working as orderlies were allowed to carry out the work needed to care for the officers. Officers of the Allied air forces were held in special camps called Stalags Luft but were accorded the required preferential treatment.

The German Army camp commanders applied the Geneva Convention requirements to suit themselves. An example was as to the amount of food/meat to be provided to each POW. In Oflag XIII-B when a dead horse was brought into the camp, its total weight (including head, bones, etc.) was used in computing the amount each POW was to receive, which resulted in each POW receiving only a few ounces of meat per week. Red Cross parcels were seldom distributed.

There were other notable exceptions to how the Geneva Convention was applied, for example the execution of recaptured prisoners, specifically from Stalag Luft 3 and Oflag IX-C. However, the inhumane treatment of Soviet prisoners, soldiers as well as officers, did not comply with these provisions, according to Joseph Goebbels "because the Soviet Union had not signed the Convention and did not follow its provisions at all".

== Aktion K ==
In March 1944 General der SS Ernst Kaltenbrunner, the head of the SS-Reichssicherheitshauptamt, enacted the Kugel Erlass ("Bullet Decree"), or Aktion K known as Aktion Kugel. It declared that prisoners who had tried to escape and were recaptured, prisoners who could not work, and prisoners who refused to work would be executed. It also stated that all officer POWs (except the Americans and British) were to be eliminated. They were supposed to be shot but instead were usually overworked, denied needed medical care, and/or starved to death.

American and British POWs were originally exempt from it (except in special cases – like air force bomber crews and commandos). The "Great Escape" at Stalag Luft III later that month caused the Germans to remove this protection from British POWs.

== See also ==
- List of POW camps in Germany
