= Château de Chaban =

Château in Saint-Léon-sur-Vézère, France

Coordinates: 45°00′48″N 1°03′38″E

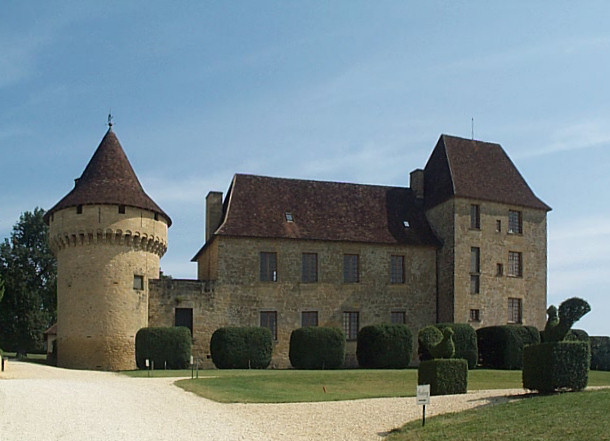
Château de Chabans Castle

The Château de Chaban, also Château de Chabans, is a château in Saint-Léon-sur-Vézère, Dordogne, Aquitaine, France.
