= Radford (surname) =

Radford is an English toponymic surname deriving from one of several places in England named "Radford", chief among these being Radford, Coventry and Radford, Nottingham. The most closely related surname to Radford is "Radforth", while a common variant is "Redford".

Notable people sharing this surname include:

Born in 19th Century

- Arthur W. Radford (1896–1973), Admiral in United States Navy
- Basil Radford (1897–1952), English actor
- Dollie Radford (1858–1920), English poet and author
- Edmund Ashworth Radford (1881–1944), English Conservative political figure
- Ernest Radford (1857–1919), English poet
- George Heynes Radford (1851–1917), British Liberal political figure
- Harry Radford (football manager) (1851–1909), English football secretary
- Henry Radford (1896–1972), English cricketer
- Lewis Radford (1869–1937), English Anglican bishop and author
- Paul Radford (1861–1945), United States baseball player
- Wally Radford (1886–1943), English footballer
- William Radford (1809–1890), Admiral in United States Navy
- William Radford (politician) (1814–1870), United States political figure

Born in 20th Century

- Albert Ernest Radford (1918–2006), United States academic and botanist
- Andy Radford (1944–2006), British Anglican bishop, Bishop of Taunton
- Barbara Radford, British figure skater
- Benjamin Radford (born 1970), United States science writer and journalist
- Bob Radford (1943–2004), Australian cricket administrator
- Brendan Radford (fl. 1990s-present), Australian musician
- Brian Radford (fl. 1950s), Welsh rugby player
- Charlie Radford (1900–1924), British footballer
- Elaine Radford (born 1958), United States author
- Eric Radford (born 1985), Canadian figure skater
- Glen Radford (born 1962), Zambian-born South African cricketer
- Howard Radford (1930–2022), Welsh footballer
- Jim Radford (1928–2020), British D-Day veteran, peace campaigner and folk-singer
- John Radford (footballer) (born 1947), English footballer
- John Radford (broadcaster) (fl. 1980s), Canadian director of radio and television stations
- Kristine Kunce (born 1970), Australian tennis player, also known as Kristine Radford
- Lee Radford (born 1979), English rugby player
- Luis Radford (fl. 2000s), Canadian educator
- Mark Radford (basketball) (born 1959), American former National Basketball Association player
- Mark Radford (footballer) (born 1968), English former footballer
- Michael Radford (born 1946), English film director and screenwriter
- Natalie Radford (born 1966), Canadian actress
- Neal Radford (born 1957), North Rhodesia (now Zambia)-n born English cricketer
- Peter Radford (born 1939), English athlete in track
- Phil Radford (born 1970s), United States environmental activist, director of Greenpeace
- Ralegh Radford (1900–1999), English archaeologist
- Richard A. Radford (1939–2006), British-born American economist, notable for his article on POW camp economics
- Robert Radford (1874–1933), English-born United States musician
- Robert Radford (footballer) (1900–?), English footballer
- Ron Radford (born 1949), Australian art museum curator
- Ronald Radford (guitarist) (fl. 1990s–present), United States musician (flamenco guitar)
- Ronnie Radford (1943–2022), English footballer
- Rosemary Radford Ruether (1936–2022), United States academic and theologian
- Sheri Radford (fl. 1990s-present), Canadian author
- Steve Radford (born 1957), British Liberal political figure
- Tim Radford (1940–2025), British-New Zealand journalist
- Toby Radford (born 1971), Welsh cricketer
- Tyrece Radford (born 1999), American basketball player
- Virginia Radford, New Zealand girl guide leader
- Wayne Radford (basketball) (1956–2021), United States athlete in basketball
- Wayne Radford (cricketer) (born 1958), Zambian-born South African cricketer

Born in the 21st century

- Harry Radford (cyclist) (born 2005), British track cyclist

== See also ==
- Radford family
