= William Radford (disambiguation) =

William Radford (1809–1890) was a rear admiral of the United States Navy.

William Radford may also refer to:

- William Radford (politician) (1814–1870), United States representative from New York
- William Radford (rugby union), Welsh international rugby union player
- William A. Radford (1865–1943), American architect and publisher
- William Howard Radford (born 1930), Welsh former footballer

== See also ==
- William Redford (born 1958), British businessman
- Radford (surname)
