= Wreford-Brown =

Wreford-Brown is a surname. Notable people include:

- Anthony Wreford-Brown (1912–1997), English cricketer
- Charles Wreford-Brown (1866–1951), English cricketer and footballer
- Chris Wreford-Brown (born 1945), retired Royal Navy officer
- Oswald Wreford-Brown (1877–1916), English footballer and cricketer
