= Radford =

Radford may refer to:

== Places ==
=== England ===
- Radford, Coventry, West Midlands
- Radford, Nottingham, Nottinghamshire
- Radford, Plymstock, Devon
- Radford, Oxfordshire
- Radford, Somerset
- Radford, Worcestershire
- Radford Cave in Devon
- Radford Semele, Warwickshire

=== United States ===
- Radford, Alabama
- Radford, Illinois
- Radford, Virginia

=== Elsewhere ===
- Radford Island, an island in the Antarctic Ocean

== People ==
- Radford (surname)
- Radford family, a British reality TV family with many children
- Radford Davis, an author of ninjutsu works
- Radford Gamack (1897–1979), Australian politician
- Radford M. Neal (born 1956), Canadian computer scientist
- Radford Sechrist (born 1990), American story artist

== Facilities and structures ==
- Radford railway station, a former train station in Nottingham, England, UK
- Radford railway station, Queensland, Australia
- Radford Army Ammunition Plant, Radford, Virginia, USA
- Radford College, Canberra, Australia; a coeducational day school
- Radford University, Radford, Virginia, USA
  - Radford Baseball Stadium
- Radford University College, Accra, Ghana
- Radford High School (disambiguation), any of several public secondary schools

== Other uses ==
- Harold Radford, London coachbuilding firm
- Radford (band), an American rock band
- Radford Electronics, an English company making valve amplifiers
- USS Radford, any of several United States Navy warships with the name

== See also ==
- Redford (disambiguation)
- Reford (disambiguation)
