= Jane Wilson-Howarth =

British author, lecturer and physician

- Wilson-Howarth in Madagascar
- Born: Jane Margaret Wilson; 1961 (age 64–65); Epsom, England, United Kingdom
- Occupations: author, lecturer, physician
- Spouse: Simon Howarth (married 1987)
- Children: Alexander; David (died 1996); Sebastian
- Writing career
- Pen name: Jane Wilson-Howarth
- Genres: narrative nonfiction, travel health, children's fiction
- Subjects: Nepal, Madagascar
- Website: www.wilson-howarth.com

Jane Wilson-Howarth is a British author, physician, lecturer and speaker. She has written three travel health guides, three memoirs, a novel and a series of wildlife adventures for children. She has contributed to anthologies of travellers' tales, has written multiple health articles for non-specialist readers, and also many academic papers.

== Personal life ==
Jane Wilson was born in Epsom Hospital, Surrey, the middle child of three born to Peggy (Margaret) Thomas (1926–2015) from London, and bibliophile Joe Wilson (1920–2011), from Ballymena in Northern Ireland. She grew up in Stoneleigh, a suburb just north of Ewell Village. She is married to Simon Howarth and the couple live between East Anglia and Kathmandu.

== Education ==
She attended Stoneleigh East County Infants', Junior and Senior Schools, and also Cheam High School but, challenged by dyslexia, left school at 16 to study for an Ordinary National Diploma in sciences at Ewell Technical College (now North East Surrey College of Technology). In March 2025, she was appointed an honorary Fellow of the college.

At Plymouth Polytechnic, she studied biological sciences concentrating on invertebrates, pollution studies, environmental resource management, and completed a research project on cave microclimate and its influence on collembola populations. This involved countless trips into Radford Cave and led to her first publication. During cave exploration in the UK she made extensive collections of invertebrates to document the animals living in lightless environments. In 1976 she was awarded a travelling fellowship by the Winston Churchill Memorial Trust, which helped fund a trip to Nepal.

The Nepal connection led to a veterinary research job and she wrote a thesis about rabbit parasites for an MSc degree from Corpus Christi College, Oxford. Through this work, she developed both an interest in immunology and a plan to work to help the poor in emerging nations and went on to study for a medical degree at the University of Southampton.

She was awarded a Diploma in Child Health (Royal College of Physicians, London 1992), a Diploma in Community Child Health (Royal College of Physicians, RCGP and Public Health Faculty, Edinburgh 1992), a Diploma of the Faculty of Sexual and Reproductive Healthcare (Royal College of Obstetricians and Gynaecologists 2007) and in 2009 fellowship in the Faculty of Travel Medicine, Royal College of Physicians and Surgeons of Glasgow. She was also elected a fellow of the British Global and Travel Health Association in 2017.

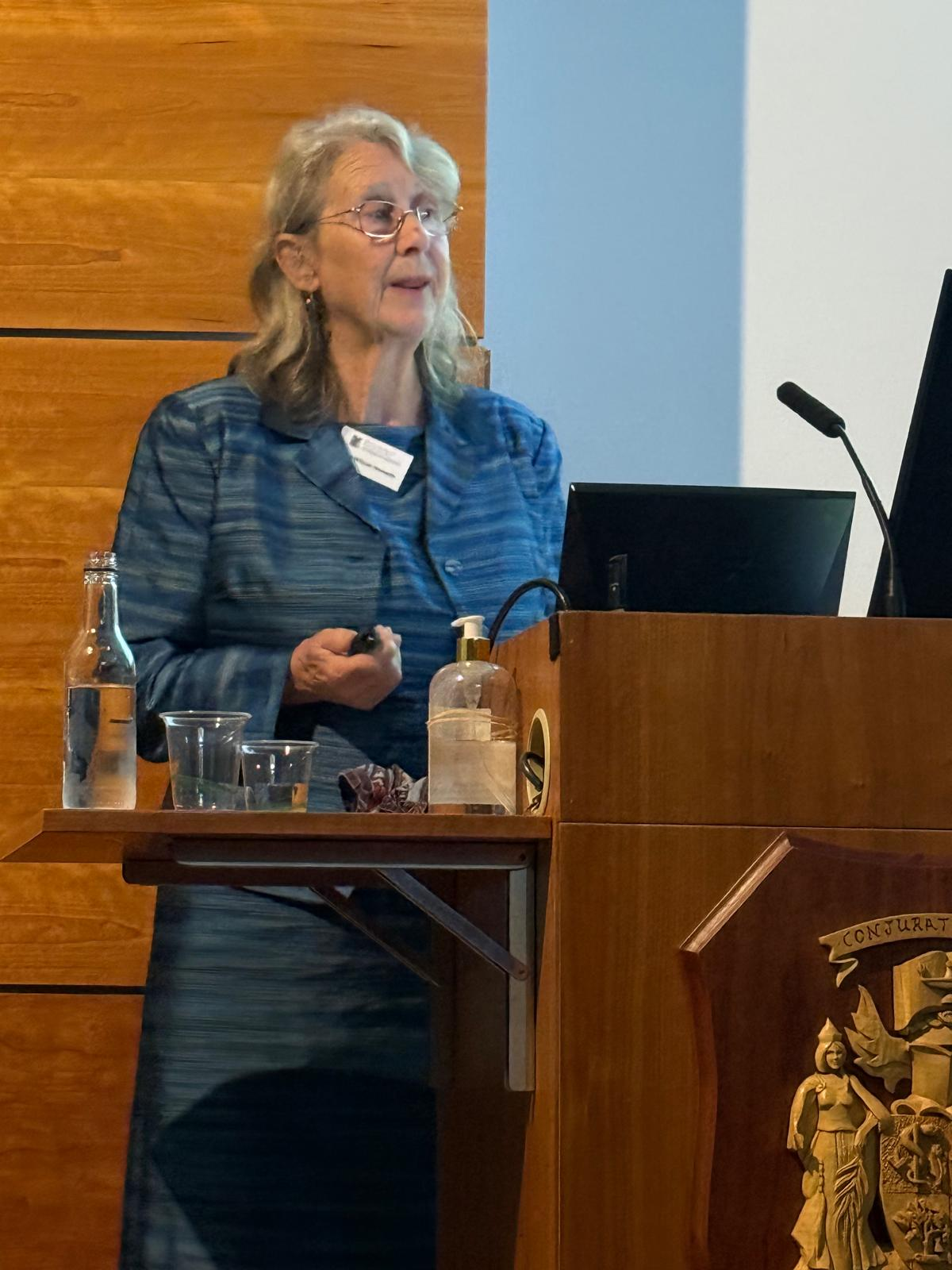
Dr Jane speaking at the Royal College of Physicians & Surgeons, October 2025

== Medical career ==
After qualifying as a doctor of medicine, Wilson-Howarth worked in orthopaedics in Salisbury, general (especially chest) medicine plus obstetrics and gynaecology in Swindon, and then paediatrics at the John Radcliffe Hospital in Oxford. She has been employed on various child survival and hygiene promotion projects in Sri Lanka, Pakistan, Indonesia, India and Nepal. Wilson-Howarth served as a National Health Service general practitioner in Cambridgeshire for more than 15 years when she taught Cambridge medical students about general practice and international health.

She also lectures on travel health, and has contributed to numerous textbooks and, on occasion, to health stories for national newspapers. She helped provide clinical care to Syrian refugees in Greece for Médecins du monde / Doctors of the World in 2016. She works on occasion for Voluntary Service Overseas, including in Nepal and also Nigeria.

Wilson-Howarth lived in Nepal from 1993 until 1998 and moved back there in 2017 for a further six years, when she worked as a volunteer, writing clinical guidelines for Nepalese paramedics and mentoring clinicians in remote mountain villages through the charity Practical Help Achieving Self Empowerment (PHASE). She has also contributed material to the bilingual COVID-19 Nepal Support website and she has articles about COVID-19 in the online Nepali newspaper Setopati.

== Awards ==
- 2025 – appointed an honorary fellow of North East Surrey College of Technology
- 2017 – elected a Fellow of the British Global and Travel Health Association
- 2009 – elected Fellow of the Faculty Travel Medicine, Royal College of Physicians and Surgeons, Glasgow (FFTM RCPS, Glasg)
- 1992 – awarded the Scott Napier Prize (from the Royal College of General Practitioners and the Syntex Award for research on postcoital contraception
- 1983 – presented with the Bish medal of the Scientific Exploration Society for "courage and determination in the face of adversity."

== Sports and expeditions ==
Wilson-Howarth started caving and also scuba diving while an undergraduate in Plymouth pursuing ecological studies. She did some cave diving and was probably the first woman to do decompression dives in the subterranean "lake" in Pridhamsleigh Cavern in Devon. In 1973, she won the British Universities and Colleges individual canoe slalom event and on the same day also the seven-mile whitewater canoeing race. In addition, she won the national colleges sailing championship. Wilson-Howarth spent six months on an overland trip to the Himalayan region; this was with a small team intent on finding new caves in Pakistan, India and Nepal and documenting which creatures lived inside them. She began some research on histoplasmosis and bat rabies, and made extensive zoological collections mostly for the Natural History Museum, London.

In 1978–79 she rowed for Corpus Christi College, Oxford, the first year the college had fielded a ladies eight, when they achieved three "bumps" in Eights Week. In 2004, she took the sport up again in Cambridge, rowing in various races on the River Cam and at Eton Dorney.

While studying medicine at Southampton she was involved in further expeditions – to Madagascar and (leading a team of eleven) Peru. In 1983 she was awarded the BISH Medal by the Scientific Exploration Society for "courage and determination in the face of adversity". She also organised a medical elective with Save the Children in Ladakh.

The first Madagascar expedition led to a second, and this work contributed to the Ankarana Massif's recognition as an important refuge for mammals, including the endangered crowned lemur, Sanford's brown lemur, as well as smaller wildlife and a previously unknown blind fish. The Massif also proved to be a rich location where important sub-fossil giant lemur remains were discovered. This work earned an honourable mention in the Rolex Awards.

== Writing ==
The little propeller-driven plane droned along the line of the great Himalaya. The middle hills beneath us looked like a frozen, fathomless, choppy sea. Tossed as we were by turbulence and updrafts, we seemed as helpless and insignificant as a lost housefly buzzing over a threatening, deep-green ocean. Machhapuchharé, the fishtail, at nearly 7,000 metres, is as high as the highest Andean giants, yet from the air it looked tiny, overshadowed as it was by the Annapurna horseshoe, the tenth highest mountain in the world.

— Jane Wilson-Howarth in A Glimpse of Eternal Snows

Wilson-Howarth's writing almost invariably has a travel theme. Her first book (when she wrote as Jane Wilson), Lemurs of the Lost World (1990, 1995), is about expeditions to Madagascar and was described as the finest travel book thus far written about Madagascar by Dervla Murphy in the Times Literary Supplement in 1996.

Her comprehensive guide to travel health originally launched as Bugs Bites & Bowels in 1995, appeared in a sixth edition in December 2023 as Staying Healthy When You Travel.

Your Child Abroad: a travel health guide was written in collaboration with paediatrician Matthew Ellis.

Her best seller How to Shit Around the World is a compilation of toilet tales, and includes an introduction by Kathleen Meyer, author of How to Shit in the Woods.

A Glimpse of Eternal Snows is a poignant memoir set in Cambridge and Nepal; it was first published in Australia and received praise in the press. A second edition was published in the UK in October 2012 and the artist who designed the cover was featured on BBC TV earlier that year. A third edition launched in India in 2015.

Sometimes perhaps a short life and a happy one is better than anything we doctors can offer. A Glimpse of Eternal Snows is the proverbial life-changing book.

— Dr James Le Fanu in The Daily Telegraph

A Glimpse of Eternal Snows was also chosen for The National Year of Reading and by BBC Radio Cambridgeshire for its "A Book a Day in May" project. Wilson-Howarth's first novel, Snowfed Waters, a fictional sequel to A Glimpse of Eternal Snows was published in the UK early in 2014 and then launched in 2017 by the Delhi-based publisher Speaking Tiger.

Wilson-Howarth has appeared at literary festivals, including twice at the Cambridge Wordfest, and has contributed to several anthologies, mainly of travel writing.

A new memoir will be published in September 2026.

She has written more than 200 travel health features for Wanderlust and several for Condé Nast Traveller and BBC Wildlife. For many years she has also acted as editor of the peer-reviewed Journal of the British Global and Travel Health Association.

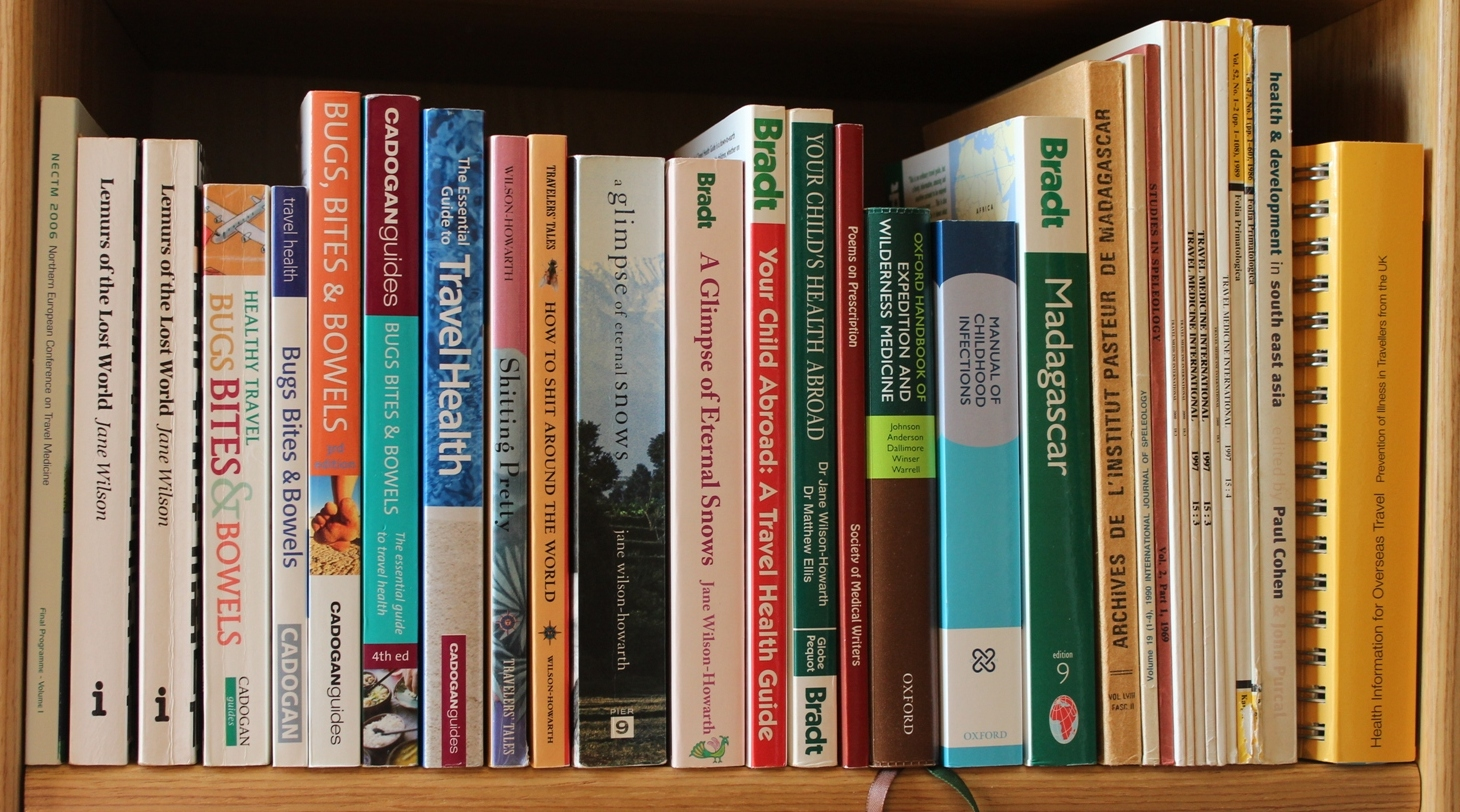

From time to time she has contributed to The Independent and other national publications. Simon Calder travel editor of the Independent newspaper called Wilson-Howarth one of the five most impressive travel authorities and she was featured by Lonely Planet's on-line travel magazine.

She often gives talks and readings especially in East Anglia, and is a member of the Society of Authors as well as Cambridge Writers. Wilson-Howarth is also active in the Walden Writers cooperative, set up in Saffron Walden, Essex, by authors Amy Corzine and Martyn Everett in 2008, to cross-promote the work of its members, publish a magazine, and run regular workshops to discuss works in progress. Other members include Victor Watson, Rosemary Hayes and Penny Speller who collaborated on a feature on writing for children published in Juno magazine.

== Broadcasting ==
Wilson-Howarth has given television interviews on BBC Breakfast as well as on ITV Tyne Tees and Sky Travel, and has presented on BBC One's Rip Off Britain. She has contributed to national BBC Radio 4 programmes, including Excess Baggage, Breakaway, The Living World, Medicine Now and World Nomads. She has been interviewed live for radio programmes broadcast in the US, Canada, South Africa, Australia, Ireland and multiple local radio stations, and is often heard on BBC Radio Cambridgeshire.

== Bibliography ==
Narrative nonfiction

- Wilson, Jane (2014). Lemurs of the Lost World: exploring the forests and Crocodile Caves of Madagascar. Impact, London. p. 216. ISBN 978-1-874687-48-1.
- Wilson-Howarth, Jane (2007). A Glimpse of Eternal Snows: a family's journey of love and loss in Nepal. Peir 9, NSW Australia. p. 432. ISBN 978-1-921-259265.
- Wilson-Howarth, Jane (2012). A Glimpse of Eternal Snows: a journey of love and loss in the Himalayas. Bradt Travel Guides, UK. p. 390. ISBN 978-1-84162-435-8.
- Wilson-Howarth, Jane (2015). A Glimpse of Eternal Snows: a journey of love and loss in the Himalayas. Speaking Tiger, New Delhi. p. 380. ISBN 978-81-930710-7-6.
- Green, Stephanie; Françoise Hivernel; Sally Haiselden; Seeta Siriwardena; Jane Wilson-Howarth (2018). 50 Camels and She's Yours: tales from five women across five continents. Cambridge. p. 305. ISBN 9781788764285.
- Wilson-Howarth, Jane (2026). Under a Himalayan Sky: love loss and learning to live. Eye / Lightning, UK. p. 320. ISBN 978-1785634734.

Travel health guides

- Wilson-Howarth, Jane (1995, 1999, 2002, 2006). Bugs Bites & Bowels republished as The Essential Guide to Travel Health (see below)
- Wilson-Howarth, Jane (2000). Shitting Pretty: how to stay clean and healthy while traveling. Travelers Tales, Calif. p. 149. ISBN 978-1885211477.
- Wilson-Howarth, Jane; Matthew Ellis (1998). Your Child's Health Abroad: a manual for travelling families. Bradt / Globe Pequot. p. 198. ISBN 1-898323-63-1.
- Wilson-Howarth, Jane (2009). The Essential Guide to Travel Health: don't let Bugs Bites & Bowels Spoil Your Trip. Cadogan, London. p. 312. ISBN 978-1-86011-424-3.
- Wilson-Howarth, Jane; Matthew Ellis (2015). Your Child Abroad: a travel health guide. Bradt. p. 212. ISBN 978-1-84162-120-3.
- Wilson-Howarth, Jane (2020). How to Shit Around the World: the art of staying clean and healthy while traveling (2 ed.). Travelers Tales, Calif. p. 178. ISBN 978-1609521929.
- Wilson-Howarth, Jane (2023). Staying Healthy When You Travel: how to avoid bugs bites belly-aches and more. Fox Chapel, Pennsylvania. p. 320. ISBN 978-1620083789.

Novels

- Wilson-Howarth, Jane (2014). Snowfed Waters: a novel. FeedARead.com. p. 316. ISBN 978-1-78407-322-0.
- Wilson-Howarth, Jane (2016). Himalayan Kidnap: the first Alex and James eco-adventure set in Nepal. Eifrig Publishing, Lemont PA. p. 176. ISBN 9781632331007.
- Wilson-Howarth, Jane (2017). Snowfed Waters: a novel. Speaking Tiger. p. 287. ISBN 9789386338211.
- Wilson-Howarth, Jane (2018). Himalayan Kidnap: the first Alex and James eco-adventure set in Nepal. Eifrig Publishing, Lemont PA. p. 234. ISBN 9781632331274.
- Wilson-Howarth, Jane (2018). Chasing the Tiger: the second Alex and James eco-adventure set in Nepal. Eifrig Publishing, Lemont PA. p. 216. ISBN 9781632331038.
- Wilson-Howarth, Jane (2018). Himalayan Hostages: the first Alex and James wildlife adventure set in Nepal. Vajra Books, Kathmandu, Nepal. p. 215. ISBN 9789937924597.
- Wilson-Howarth, Jane (2018). Himalayan Hideout: the second Alex and James wildlife adventure set in Nepal. Vajra Books, Kathmandu, Nepal. p. 210. ISBN 9789937924573.
- Wilson-Howarth, Jane (2021). Himalayan Heist: an Alex and James wildlife adventure set in Nepal. Vajra Books, Kathmandu, Nepal. p. 274. ISBN 9789937624114.
- Wilson-Howarth, Jane (2023). Madagascar Misadventure: an Alex and James wildlife tale. Audible. p. 263. ASIN B0CQD9HLBT. ISBN 978-1-806545-07-0.

Contributions published in anthologies and online magazines

- Barclay, Jennifer; Phillips, Adrian, eds. (2015). "Remnant of the Raj". To Oldly Go: tales of intrepid travel. Chalfont St Peter: Bradt Travel Guides. p. 240. ISBN 978-1784770273.
- Lowen, James; Hilary Bradt (2019). Kidding Around: tales of travel with children. Chalfont St Peter: Bradt Travel Guides. p. 226. ISBN 978-1784771058.
- Poems on Prescription. Society of Medical Writers, UK. 2012. pp. 103pp. ISBN 978-0-9573575-0-1.
- "Doctors writing about patients". Books by Women. 2014.
- "Power to Heal". When Women Waken. 2014. Archived from the original on 5 September 2015.
- "Making time for writing". Books by Women. 2015.
- "Representing Refugees". Books by Women. 2016.
- "Writing Adventure Stories for Children". Books by Women. 2016.
- "Creating an Audiobook - in Kathmandu". Books by Women. 2021.
- "Downpour - a short story". StepAway magazine. 2025.
