= Wreford =

Wreford is a name originating in Devon, England. It may refer to:

- Wreford, Kansas, United States
- Rural Municipality of Wreford No. 280, Saskatchewan, Canada

== People with the surname ==
- Catherine Wreford (born 1980), Canadian actor
- Edgar Wreford (1923–2006), English actor
- Lorraine Wreford (born 1961), Australian politician

== See also ==
- Wreford-Brown, a surname
- Reford (disambiguation)
