= George J. Iles =

United States military officer and fighter pilot (1918–2004)

- Born: George Jewell Iles; November 6, 1918; Quincy, Illinois, US
- Died: December 9, 2004 (aged 86); California, US
- Resting place: Sierra View Memorial Park, Olivehurst, California
- Occupations: Military officer; fighter pilot
- Years active: 1943–1973
- Awards: Congressional Gold Medal awarded to the Tuskegee Airmen

George Jewell Iles (November 6, 1918 – December 9, 2004) was a U.S. Army Air Force officer, former World War II Prisoner of War in Nazi Germany, and combat fighter pilot with the 332nd Fighter Group's 99th Fighter Squadron, best known as the all-African American Tuskegee Airmen.

On February 25, 1945, Iles was shot down, captured and eventually imprisoned in Stalag VII-A, the largest POW camp in Nazi Germany. On April 29, 1945, General George Patton and his Third Army liberated Iles and 76,000 other POWs.

Iles served in the U.S. Air Force for 30 years, including service in World War II, the Korean War, and the Vietnam War.

== Early life ==
Iles was born on November 6, 1918, in Quincy, Adams County, Illinois to George D. Iles and Juanita Howell Iles. His father was a barber and later was an employee at Firestone's Electric Wheel Works.

Iles attended Lincoln Elementary, a segregated school. Later he attended Quincy High School, graduating in 1935. After graduating from high school, Iles worked in the Civilian Conservation Corps for three years before enrolling in Quincy College.

== World War II ==
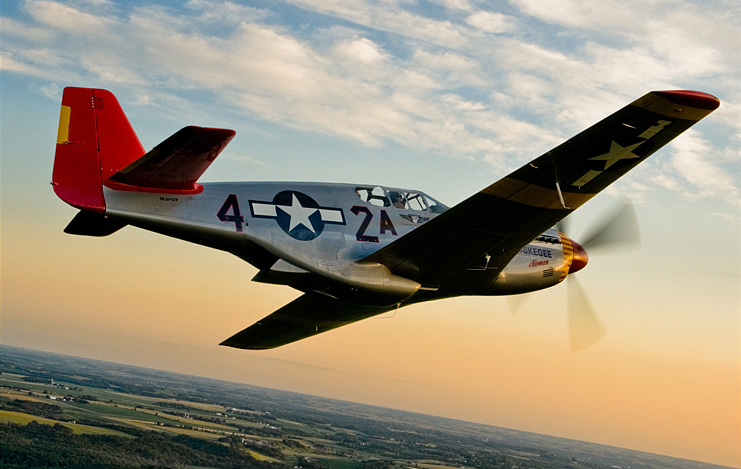
P-51 aircraft with red markings. (Note: The Tuskegee Airmen became known for flying the P-51 aircraft with red markings that distinguished the Tuskegee Airmen included red bands on the noses of P-51s as well as a red rudder; their P-51B and D Mustangs flew with similar color schemes, with red propeller spinners, yellow wing bands and all-red tail surfaces.)

Iles joined the newly formed Civilian Pilot Training Program (CPTP), earning his civilian pilot's license in 1939. He became Quincy's first African American licensed pilot. In 1942 Iles enlisted in the United States Army. In June, 1943, he was accepted for Tuskegee's Flight cadet program. An earlier application had been rejected.

On May 23, 1944, Iles graduated from the Tuskegee cadet pilot training school in its Class 44-E-SE, receiving his wings and commission as a 2nd Lieutenant. After completing 90-day combat and fighter training at Walterboro Army Air Field in Walterboro, South Carolina, the U.S. Army Air Corps assigned Iles to the all-African American 99th Fighter Squadron of the 332nd Fighter Group, best known as the "Tuskegee Airmen" or "Red Tails. He flew 23 missions in World War II's European Theater.

On the afternoon of February 25, 1945, the German military captured Iles in Augsburg, Germany after anti-aircraft artillery damaged his North American P-51 Mustang. Iles made every effort to stay in the air, maintaining contact with his squadron leader who urged Iles to fly to neutral Switzerland. After losing radio contact with Iles, his commanders were unable to determine if Iles managed to reach Switzerland, had been shot down and captured, or killed. The U.S. Army Air Corps sent an official notice to Iles' then-wife, Cornelia, indicating he was listed as missing in action and had been awarded, in absentia, the Air Medal with one leaf cluster.

The Germans initially held Iles at Stalag Luft 3, then at Nuremberg-Langwasser, before transferring him to the 86 acre, multinational prisoner of war camp, Stalag VII-A, the largest POW camp in Nazi Germany. While imprisoned, Iles would reconnect with fellow 99th Fighter Squadron pilot/Cadet 44-E-SE classmate, Harold Brown (Tuskegee Airman), who had been shot down weeks earlier.

On April 29, 1945, General George Patton and his Third Army liberated Iles, Brown, and 76,000+ other POWs when they captured Stalag VII-A.

== Later life and death ==
Iles' first wife was Cornelia Elizabeth Vinton Iles. When Iles left for the European Theater during World War II, Cornelia stayed with her mother in Quincy, Illinois, later moving to Denver, Colorado when Iles returned from the war. They had two children: one who did not survive beyond infancy and Bruce Adrion Iles, a U.S. Marine corporal and rifleman who served in Alpha Company, 1st Battalion, 5th Marines (First Infantry Division) in Vietnam. On May 15, 1967, Bruce was killed in action by small arms fire near Phuoc Thong, Quang Nam province, South Vietnam. Bruce was interred at Fort Logan National Cemetery in Denver, Colorado, Denver County.

Iles' second wife Jola (Vola) Marie Neesen Iles, was a Dutch woman from Venlo, Holland. They had one son, Danny. They settled in Marysville, California.

After World War II, Iles returned to the United States, serving as a trainer at Tuskegee Air Force Field. He reenlisted on July 13, 1946. In 1948, Iles graduated from Boston University, earning a bachelor's degree in Business Administration. He also earned a master's degree.

During the Korean War and the Vietnam War, Iles served in intelligence in Korea, Japan, and Vietnam. He retired on October 31, 1973 with the rank of Colonel.

Iles died on December 9, 2004, in California. He is interred at Sierra View Memorial Park in Olivehurst, California in Yuba County. His wife Jola died a year later and is buried by his side.

== Legacy ==
- Iles created the Iles Academy of Golf for Kids in Maryville, California, a leadership and sports non-profit.
- George J. Iles Elementary School in Quincy, Illinois, opened in August 2018, was named to honor Iles.
- In 2020 as part of the Moorman Foundation and Arts Quincy's "Celebration of Education" series, Cedar Falls, Iowa Sculptor Tim Jorgensen installed his "Red Tails" sculptor at Iles' namesake, the George J. Iles Elementary School in Quincy, Illinois.

== Awards and honors ==
- Congressional Gold Medal Awarded to Tuskegee Airmen in 2006
- Legion of Merit
- Bronze Star with cluster
- Air Medal with three clusters
- Purple Heart with one oak leaf cluster
- Air Force Association's Certificate of Honor for Outstanding Service to the Cause of Human Rights by Virtue of Action Taken in Behalf of American MIAs and POWS in Southeast Asia.

== See also ==
- List of Tuskegee Airmen Cadet Pilot Graduation Classes
- List of Tuskegee Airmen
- Military history of African Americans
- Dogfights (TV series)
- Executive Order 9981
- The Tuskegee Airmen (movie)
