= Wayne Radford =

Wayne Radford may refer to:

- Wayne Radford (basketball) (1956–2021), American professional basketball player
- Wayne Radford (cricketer) (born 1958), South African former cricketer
