= S360 =

S360 may refer to:

- Honda S360, a 1962 sports car
- Sendo S360, a Sendo mobile phone model
- Sony CLIÉ PEG-S360, a Sony CLIÉ PDA model
- a Waves Audio processor
- Studio S360, a Radford Electronics loudspeaker model

S/360 may refer to:

- IBM System/360, a 1964 mainframe computer system family
