= Redford =

Redford may refer to:

== Places ==
=== Australia ===
- Redford, Queensland, a locality split between the Shire of Murweh and the Maranoa Region

=== United Kingdom ===
- Redford, Angus
- Redford, Dorset
- Redford, Edinburgh
- Redford, West Sussex

=== United States ===
- Redford, Michigan; a township
  - Redford Union School District
- Old Redford, Detroit, Michigan; a neighborhood
- Redford, Missouri
- Redford, New York
- Redford, Texas

== People ==
- Redford (surname)
- Redford Mulock, CBE, DSO (1886–1961) Canadian Air Commodore
- Redford Pennycook (born 1985), rugby player
- Redford Webster (1761–1833), U.S. apothecary
- Redford White (1955–2010), Filipino actor

== Facilities and structures ==
- Redford Barracks, Redford, Edinburgh, Scotland, UK
- Redford Union High School, Redford, Michigan, USA
- Redford High School, Detroit, Michigan, USA
- Redford Theatre, Detroit, Michigan, USA

== Other uses ==
- Redford cabinet (2011–2014), Alberta government cabinet of Allison Redford

== See also ==
- Battle of Red Ford (1294) Lorne, Scotland
- Redfield (disambiguation)
- Radford (disambiguation)
- Reford (disambiguation)
