= North East Surrey College of Technology =

Coordinates: 51.3427°N 0.2448°W

North East Surrey College Of Technology

Location
- Reigate Road; Ewell, Epsom, Surrey, KT17 3DS; England

Information
- Type: General Further Education College
- Department for Education URN: 130822 Tables
- Ofsted: Reports
- Principal: Julie Kapsalis
- Gender: Mixed
- Age: 16+
- Enrolment: 2,000 under-19s, 2,500 adults and HE (2018/9)
- Website: https://www.nescot.ac.uk

The North East Surrey College Of Technology (NESCOT) is a large further education and higher education college in Epsom and Ewell, Surrey, England that began as Ewell Technical College in the 1950s.

== Facilities ==
Nescot has specialist practical facilities including a construction department on site with trade specific workshops for Bricklaying, Plumbing, Carpentry, Electrical Installation and Plastering. Performance and Media have dance studios, recording facilities, dark rooms and a Mac suite. The college also has two theatres, one traditional with tiered seating which was used by Kingswood House School in their production of Peter Pan in February 2016, it was the first time the theatre had ever been used with flying as part of a production and a modern performance space. Other curriculum areas are supported with a beauty salon, onsite nursery, labs, an Animal Care Centre, Student Advice Centre, Learning Resource Centre - and an Osteopathy clinic.

The college sports centre, gym, salon, nursery and playing fields are open to the general public.

== Structure and organisation ==
The college is governed by The Nescot Further Education Corporation.

== Academic profile ==
As of 2018-2019 the college drew around 5,000 students from the local community, nationally and overseas.

In addition to the traditional further education college subjects, the college offers distance learning, and customised training programmes for businesses.

=== Higher education ===
The college offers higher education in Animal Care, Osteopathy, Computing, Teaching, and counselling, among others.

=== Software training ===
The school is recognised as an Apple Authorised Training Centre and holds academy status with Cisco Systems, Microsoft, and Oracle as a specialist training provider.

=== Performance ===
A 2016 Ofsted inspection assessed the school overall as Grade 2 (good), with Grade 1 (outstanding) in several areas.

== Notable alumni ==
- David Bellamy, author, broadcaster, environmental campaigner and botanist
- Frank Hampson cartoonist
- Jaden Ladega, actor
- Anthoni Salim, businessman, investor, and money manager
- Prof. Peter Saville, psychologist
- Joe Wicks, fitness coach
- Dr. Jane Wilson-Howarth, author
- Jimmy Page, musician

== Honorary Fellows of the College ==
- Yvonne Spencer
- Val Neame
- Dee Mathieson, radiotherapy innovator
- Daniel Addo
- Jane Wilson-Howarth
- Paul Nicholson (darts player)

== Staff ==
=== Lisa Charles ===
In June 2025, Lisa Charles, a hairdressing lecturer at the college was given the silver award for Further Education Lecturer of the Year by the Pearson National Teaching Awards, due to her innovative approach to teaching and learning. She also volunteers with cancer and dementia patients at the Royal Marsden Hospital in London, while supporting their families and those undergoing chemotherapy. She also works with the homeless. On 28 November 2025, she appeared on the BBC One television magazine and chat show programme The One Show, hosted by Alex Jones and Clara Amfo. She was given the gold award by Matt Allwright. She received congratulatory messages from The Traitors star Stephen Fry and Jools Holland, the latter of whom invited her to a recording of his contemporary music television show Later... with Jools Holland.
