= Reford =

Reford may refer to:

== Places ==
- Rural Municipality of Reford No. 379, Saskatchewan, Canada
- Jardins de Métis, Quebec, Canada, known in English as "Reford Gardens"

== People ==
- Reford MacDougall, president of the St. Andrew's Society of Montreal
- Alexander Reford, Canadian historian; great-great-grandson of Robert Reford Sr.
- Elsie Reford, Canadian horticulturist, namesake of the Reford Gardens, and wife to the younger Robert Reford
- Lewis Reford, candidate for the Conservative Party of Canada in the 2006 Canadian federal election
- Robert Wilson Reford Sr., Canadian businessman and philanthropist
- Robert Wilson Reford Jr., son of Robert Reford Sr.

== See also ==
- Wreford (disambiguation)
- Radford (disambiguation)
- Redford (disambiguation)
- Ford (disambiguation)
