= Amy Corzine =

American-born writer and poet

- Born: USA
- Occupation: Author
- Writing career
- Period: Past, Present and Future
- Genres: Adult and Children's Fiction and Non-fiction; Travel, Fantasy, Science Fiction; Poetry
- Subjects: folklore, theology/philosophy, environment/ecology
- Website: www.amycorzine.com

Amy Corzine is an American-born fiction and non-fiction writer and poet. Her first book was a Cadogan travel guide to Ireland for families in which she included stories she wrote based on Irish folktales. After that, Watkins Publishing commissioned her for 'The Secret Life of the Universe: The Quest for the Soul of Science'.

== Early life and education ==
Mythology, fairy tales, music, and poetry fascinated Amy Corzine from the beginning and she spent much of her youth writing poems and playlets and working in local theatre.

She completed a BA in English literature from The University of Texas at Austin and an MA in Creative Writing from Antioch University's British Studies Centre in London, which included study at University College Dublin's Irish Folklore Department and Yeats Summer School in Ireland.

She attended the Waldorf Institute for Teacher Training in New York and the Webber-Douglas Academy of Dramatic Art in London.

== Career ==
Early in her working life in the US, she began writing and editing professionally. Eventually, she went to London to become a teacher in an independent primary school. She planned to develop her storytelling skills while nurturing the imaginations and resilience of the children under her tutelage. Then she moved on to hold several jobs in the UK, from reading scripts for the film industry (for Pathé Pictures and First Film Foundation) and editing books for publishers, including Dorling Kindersley, Vermilion/Ebury Press/Random House, Collins & Brown, Quarto, Barefoot Books and Bridgewater Book Company/Ivy Press. She has worked as a PR executive and writing consultant and is also a published and performance poet.

Cadogan Guides commissioned her to write a travel guide for Ireland, into which she poured her knowledge of Irish folklore and mythology and teaching experience and for which she explored every county of the country.

Watkins Books asked her to write a book investigating the way science was turning to consciousness studies and meditation for answers to the world's problems. This expanded into an examination of the elements in our surroundings and inside ourselves that make people happy so that the book became an exploration of and a guide to positive things that humanity is doing regarding health, education and our environment. (See the Book Reviews section of 'The Scientific and Medical Network' magazine for 2009, pp. 49–50.)

Commissions for graphic novel adaptations have come her way and she has appeared at a range of venues, sometimes sharing her poetry.

She has also edited and contributed to books of poetry and reviewed others' books – including 'A Poet's Love Song to Nature'. She has written about the experience of reworking a classic novel for publication as a graphic novel for reluctant readers, an endeavour that was described as a fabulous job.

== Work with Walden Writers ==
Amy Corzine set up the Walden Writers co-operative with local historian and author Martyn Everett in 2008 to promote the work of its members and organise literary events. Out of that grew a literary magazine and, in recent years, a writers' workshop, which meets monthly. Other members of Walden Writers include narrative nonfiction writer Jane Wilson-Howarth; children's authors Rosemary Hayes, Penny Speller, Victor Watson (author) and biographer Clare Mulley. In Summer 2017, Corzine, Hayes, Watson, and Wilson-Howarth collaborated on a feature on writing for children for Juno magazine.

== Books ==
=== Travel Guide ===
- Take the Kids: Ireland. Cadogan Guides, London. 2004. p. 308. ISBN 978-1-86011-110-5.
- Take the Kids: Ireland. Cadogan Guides, London. 2006. p. 308. ISBN 978-1-86011-315-4.

=== Graphic novel ===
- Charlotte Bronte's Jane Eyre - The Graphic Novel - Original Text. Classical Comics, UK. 2008. p. 141. ISBN 978-1-906332-06-8.

=== Non-fiction ===
- Corzine, Amy (2008). The Secret Life of the Universe: The Quest for the Soul of Science, Watkins Publishing, UK. Watkins Media Limited. p. 276. ISBN 978-1-905857-65-4.

== Sources ==
"Archived copy" (PDF). Archived from the original (PDF) on 2019-01-23.
