= Rosemary Hayes =

British novelist (born 1942)

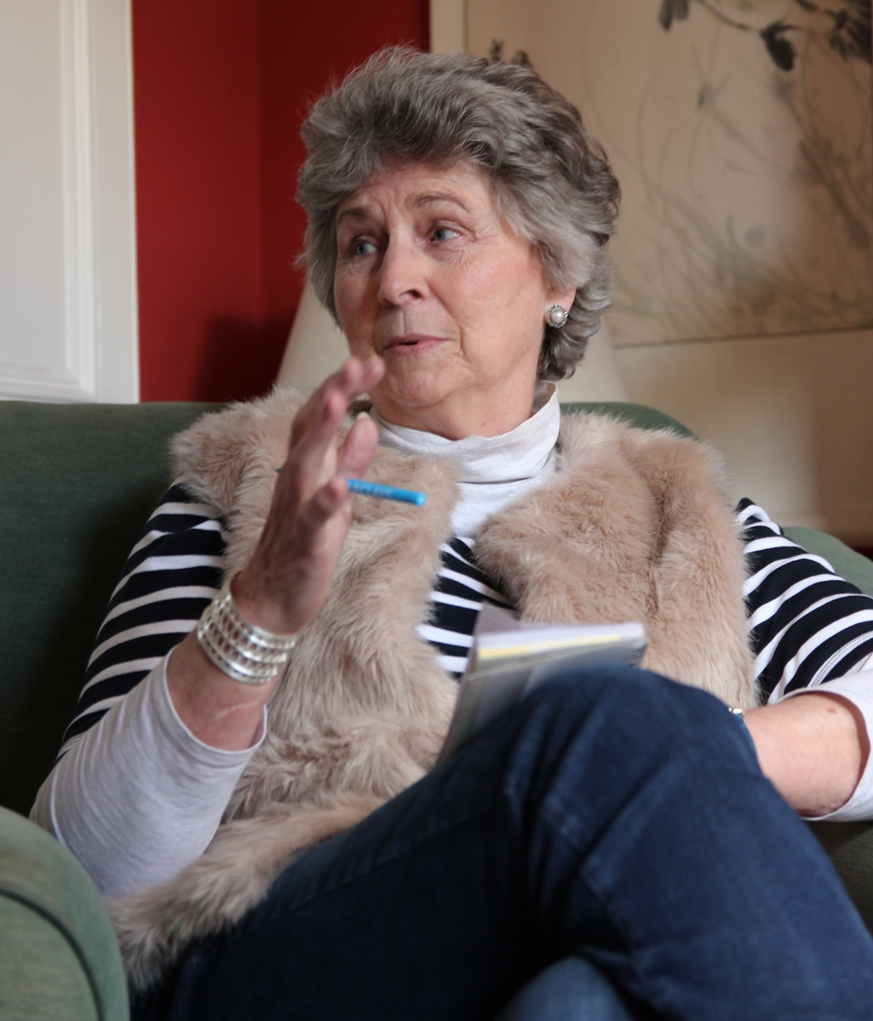
- Born: Rosemary Bates; 10 December 1942 (age 83); Newbury, Berkshire, England, UK
- Occupations: Author, Creative Writing tutor
- Spouse: Colin Hayes
- Children: Alex, Philippa and Oliver
- Writing career
- Genre: Children’s
- Subject: Historical fiction/Fantasy/ Adventure
- Website: rosemaryhayes.co.uk

Rosemary Hayes (born 10 December 1942) is a British author who has written around 50 books for children aged from seven years to teenagers and adult historical fiction. Before becoming a full time writer she worked for Cambridge University Press and then set up her own publishing house, Anglia Young Books.

== Early life and education ==
Hayes was born and brought up in rural Berkshire. She read avidly as a child and was particularly influenced by the books of Elizabeth Goudge and the Chronicles of Narnia by C. S. Lewis.

Hayes attended Brightwalton Primary School from 1947-50 then St Gabriel’s, Sandleford Priory in Newbury. In 1970, she enrolled in a Creative Writing Course at Monash University, Melbourne, Australia.

== Career ==
Hayes came to writing from a background in advertising, marketing and publishing. She worked intermittently for Cambridge University Press from 1986-2001 and one of her jobs was to run a national children’s writing competition, The Cambridge Young Writers’ Award, which attracted thousands of entries. In 1989, she launched her own publishing company, Anglia Young Books, producing curriculum-related historical fiction for primary schools. She sold the company to Mill Publishing in 2000 but continued to commission books for the new owners for several years. She has written more than 45 books for children and is working on more. Her first novel, ‘Race Against Time’ (set in Australia) was runner up for the Kathleen Fidler Award in 1988. Many of Hayes’ other books have been shortlisted for awards. Details are on her author website. Hayes teaches Creative Writing at an adult learning centre in Letchworth and runs creative writing workshops in various schools in England.

Hayes is an active member of Walden Writers and within this she set up a critique group with other published authors including Penny Speller, Amy Corzine, Victor Watson author and Jane Wilson-Howarth. She is also a member of the Society of Authors, East Anglian Writers, and The Scattered Authors’ Society.

She has lived and worked in France, USA and Australia and has traveled widely in Europe as well as the Middle and Far East{{Citation needed}}. Her researches for Forgotten Footprints and The Blue-eyed Aborigine took her to the Netherlands and the Shipwreck Museum in Freemantle, Australia. Hayes has frequently been interviewed on local radio (BBC Radio Cambridgeshire, BBC Radio Essex, BBC Radio Suffolk) and in the press (Cambridge News and Eastern Daily Press).

== Books ==
- Race Against Time. Penguin, UK. 1988. p. 160. ISBN 9780140329759.
- Scent of Danger. Blackie/Yearling. 1989. p. 128. ISBN 9780440862611.
- The Fox in the Wood. Anglia Young Books. 1989. p. 64. ISBN 9781871173024.
- Flight of the Mallard. Anglia Young Books. 1989. p. 64. ISBN 9781871173062.
- Dreamchild. Penguin UK. 1990. p. 112. ISBN 9780140360585.
- The Gremlin Buster. Penguin UK. 1990. p. 80. ISBN 9780140341331.
- Seal Cry. Penguin UK. 1991. p. 112. ISBN 9780140362893.
- Mission from the Marsh. Anglia Young Books. 1991. p. 64. ISBN 9781871173123.
- The Smell that Got Away. Penguin UK. 1992. p. 96. ISBN 9780140348071.
- Herbie's Place. Penguin Australia. 1994. p. 216. ISBN 9780140363210.
- The Big Shrink. Cambridge University Press. 1996. p. 32. ISBN 9780521468831.
- The Grabbing Bird. Cambridge University Press. 1996. p. 32. ISBN 9780521468800.
- The Treasure Cave. Cambridge University Press. 1996. p. 32. ISBN 9780521468862.
- Jumble Power. Cambridge University Press. 1996. p. 32. ISBN 9780521468848.
- The Magic Sword. Cambridge University Press. 1996. p. 32. ISBN 9780521468879.
- The Peace Ring. Cambridge University Press. 1996. pp. 32. ISBN 9780521468817.
- Mr Mulch's Magic Mixtures. Cambridge University Press. 1996. p. 32. ISBN 9780521559294.
- The Amazing Mr Mulch. Cambridge University Press. 1996. p. 32. ISBN 9780521468824.
- The Slippery Planet. Cambridge University Press. 1996. p. 32. ISBN 9780521674775.
- The Silver Fox. Penguin Australia. 1997. p. 216. ISBN 9780140380279.
- Holly and the Dream Fixer. Penguin Australia. 1998. p. 96. ISBN 9780141300306.
- The Big Shrink (play script). Cambridge University Press. 2000. p. 32. ISBN 9780521664547.
- Blood Ties. Penguin Australia. 2001. p. 122. ISBN 9780141304144.
- Follow That Lion. Penguin Australia. 2001. p. 72. ISBN 9780141311777.
- Troubled Waters. Hodder. 2003. p. 176. ISBN 9780340854693.
- To the Edge of the Ocean. Hodder. 2004. p. 176. ISBN 9780340854709.
- Bright Horizon. Hodder. 2004. p. 192. ISBN 9780340854716.
- The Gangbusters. Anglia Young Books. 2004. p. 64. ISBN 9781871173970.
- Secrets and Spies. Anglia Young Books. 2007. p. 216. ISBN 9781904936084.
- Mixing It. Frances Lincoln. 2007. pp. 185. ISBN 9781845074951.
- Payback. Frances Lincoln. 2009. pp. 208. ISBN 9781845079352.
- The Blue Eyed Aborigine. Frances Lincoln. 2010. p. 256. ISBN 9781847800787.
- Rising Above Bullying. Jessica Kingsley Publishing. 2011. p. 192. ISBN 9781849051231.
- Loose Connections. Frances Lincoln. 2012. p. 208. ISBN 9781847802934.
- The Mark. Troika Books. 2015. p. 272. ISBN 9781909991187.
- The Travellers: Tess. Ransom. 2015. p. 124. ISBN 9781781279670.
- The Travellers: Mike. Ransom. 2015. p. 106. ISBN 9781781279687.
- The Travellers: Lizzie. Ransom. 2015. p. 102. ISBN 9781781279694.
- The Travellers: Ben. Ransom. 2015. p. 120. ISBN 9781781279700.
- Forgotten Footprints. Troika. 2017. p. 272. ISBN 978-1909991491.
- My Sister's Perfect Husband. Ransom. 2018. ISBN 9781785912573.
- The Blue Eyed Aborigine. Troika. 2018. p. 224. ISBN 978-1909991507.
- The Stonekeeper's Child Book 1 The Call. Yew Tree Books. 2019. p. 178. ISBN 978-1788769259.
- The Stonekeeper's Child Book 2 Kalen's Revenge. Yew Tree Books. 2019. p. 162. ISBN 978-1788769242.
- Break Out. The Book Guild. 2022. p. 186. ISBN 978-1913913861.
- The King's Command: for God or Country. Sharpe Books. 2023. ISBN 979-8852282477.
- Traitors Game (Soldier Spy book 1). Sharpe Books. 2024. ISBN 979-8340308788.
- The King's Agent (Soldier Spy book 2). Sharpe Books. 2025. ISBN 9798280443235.
- Code of Honour (Soldier Spy book 3). Sharpe Books. 2026. ISBN 9798246627709.
