= Victor Watson (author) =

English author

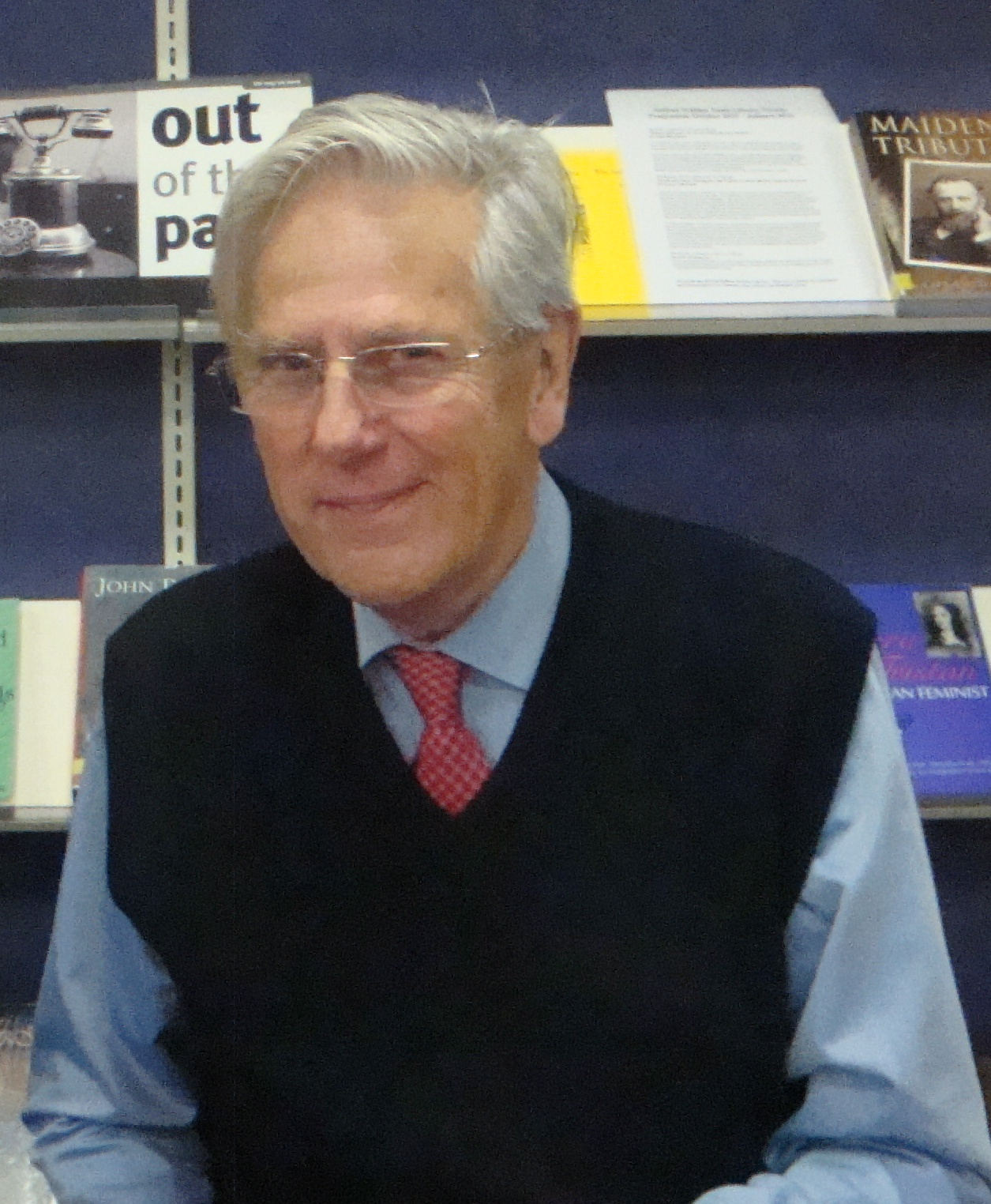
- Watson at the Saffron Walden Library, December 2015
- Born: 1936 (age 88–89); Littleport, Cambridgeshire, England
- Occupation: Author
- Period: Second World War
- Genre: Academic, Children's
- Subject: Historical fiction, Adventure
- Spouse: Judy White
- Children: 3

Website
- paradisebarn.com

Victor Watson (born 1936) is an English author who has written on the nature and history of children's literature and on how children learn to read. He later turned to writing novels for children, young adults and adults.

== Early life ==
Watson was born and brought up in Littleport in the Isle of Ely (now part of Cambridgeshire). His father, George Watson, was a printer and stationer, and his mother, née Emily Manning, one of a large family of fairground travellers. His mother ran the family stationer's and bookshop while his father served in the Second World War.

== Education ==
Watson attended the County Primary School at Littleport, Cambridgeshire and Soham Grammar School. After national service in the Royal Artillery, he read English at University College, London studying amongst other topics Old English which is also known as Anglo-Saxon. He followed that with a master's degree, while employed as a research assistant to Professor J. R. Sutherland.

== Career ==
From 1962 until 1969 he taught English at Sherrardswood School, a private primary and secondary institution in Welwyn Garden City. He then moved into teacher education: five years at Saffron Walden Teacher Training College, and later as a lecturer in English at Homerton College, Cambridge, where he specialised in 18th and 19th-century literature and the history of children's books.

== Books published ==
Watson's main academic publications are After Alice – Exploring Children's Literature, The Prose and the Passion: Children and their Reading, and Voices: Texts, Contexts and Readers all of which Watson co-edited with Eve Bearne and Morag Styles. Later came Talking Pictures: Pictorial texts and young readers with Morag Styles; Opening the Nursery Door, with Morag Styles and Mary Hilton, and Where Texts and Children Meet, with Eve Bearne. He edited The Cambridge Guide to Children's Books in English, and co-wrote Coming of Age in Children's Literature with Professor Margaret Meek.

One of his later academic works, Reading Series Fiction: from Arthur Ransome to Gene Kemp, allowed him to focus on the genre of children's books he is most interested in. Subsequently, he wrote a series of war stories for eight to thirteen-year-old children, beginning with Paradise Barn, which was shortlisted for the Branford-Boase Award. Watson followed this with three sequels. The last of these, Everyone a Stranger won the 2014 East Anglian Children's Book Award. This quartet was followed by a thriller which was also a war novel, Operation Blackout; although this was last to be published it comes chronologically after Paradise Barn. All five remain in print in the UK.

Watson has been influenced as a writer by the work of Jan Mark, William Mayne and Philippa Pearce, indeed in 2008 he gave an inaugural lecture at the first Philippa Pearce Memorial Lecture and wrote an afterword for a 2014 reissue of Pearce's Tom's Midnight Garden. At an Oxford Children's Book Group meeting in 2013 he spoke of his belief that series fiction is "a powerful way of fostering a love of independent reading", quoting a small boy as telling him that reading a new book was like entering a room full of strangers, but that series fiction was like "a room full of friends".

In June 2020 Watson published his first novel for adults "The Cuckoo Season" which is set in East Anglia and London in 1952, and in 2022 the book he edited about Lucy Boston was launched. Of his latest novel, Time After Time, he said, "I’ve always been fascinated by the idea of England before it became crowded, when you could walk for days without meeting anyone."

== Novels published so far ==
- Paradise Barn
- Operation Blackout
- The Deeping Secrets
- Hidden Lies
- Everyone a Stranger
- The Cuckoo Season
- Time After Time

== National Centre for Children's Books ==
Almost from its inception, Watson has been a trustee of an organization committed to establishing in the UK a national archive of manuscripts, artwork and books relating to children's literature. He chaired this organization during the main fundraising and building period, which led in 2005 to the opening of Seven Stories, the National Centre for Children's Books. His own collection of children's popular literature, mainly story papers and annuals, was transferred there in April 2016.

== Walden Writers ==
Watson is a member of the Walden Writers co-operative, set up in Saffron Walden by authors Amy Corzine and Martyn Everett in 2008 to promote the work of its members and organise literary events. Other members include children's authors Rosemary Hayes and Penny Speller, fiction and non-fiction writer and poet Amy Corzine, travel-writer and novelist Jane Wilson-Howarth, biographer Clare Mulley, novelist Carol Frazer, and historian Lizzie Sanders.

== Personal life ==
Watson is married to Judy, also a teacher; they have three children, Sally, Lucy and Tim, and four granddaughters.
