= Armour G. McDaniel =

American fighter pilot (1916–1989)

Armour McDaniel
- Born: Armour G. McDaniel, Sr. July 7, 1916; Martinsville, Virginia, US
- Died: November 12, 1989 (aged 73) Indianapolis, Indiana, US
- Buried: Arlington National Cemetery
- Service years: 1942–1964
- Rank: Lieutenant colonel
- Education: Virginia State University, Temple University and Rider College

Armour G. McDaniel, Sr. (July 7, 1916 – November 12, 1989) was an American military officer who served as a U.S. Air Force lieutenant colonel and commanded the 332nd Fighter Group's 301st Fighter Squadron, a Tuskegee Airmen unit. McDaniels also served as the Commandant of Cadets at Tuskegee Army Airfield. He fought in World War II and was briefly held as a prisoner of war in Nazi Germany.

== Early life and education ==
Armour G. McDaniel, Sr. was born July 7, 1916, in Martinsville, Virginia, to Charlie and Mary Earley McDaniel.

He attended both Lucy Addison High School in Roanoke, Virginia, and the Piedmont Christian Institute (high school).

He attended Virginia State University, graduating with a B.S. in business administration. He also graduated from Temple University with a P.A. in economics, and received his teacher qualification from Rider College in Princeton, New Jersey.

He returned to Martinsville, Virginia, to teach English, history and social science at an all African-American high school until the beginning of World War II.

== Military service ==
McDaniel attended flight training at Tuskegee Army Airfield in Tuskegee, Alabama, as a member of its Class 43-A-SE, one of the first flight classes at the airfield. After completing training on January 14, 1943, he was deployed to Italy in December 1943 as a member of the all-African American 332nd Fighter Group's 301st Fighter Squadron, best known as the "Tuskegee Airmen." The squadron's mission was to provide air cover for Allied ships using Naples harbor and escort Allied bombers into Germany's strategic targets.

On March 24, 1945, Col. Benjamin O. Davis Jr. led 332nd Fighter Group pilots on a 1,600 miles (2,600 km) bomber escort mission from the Foggia Airfield Complex's Ramitelli AirField in Italy to protect Fifteenth Air Force bombers on a mission to attack a tank assembly plant in Berlin, Germany. When fighters scheduled to take over escort duties failed to show up and Davis's plane began to suffer engine problems, requiring him to head back to Ramitelli, McDaniel, now a captain, assumed command from Davis, leading the pilots to Berlin despite their P-51 aircraft running low on fuel. As they neared Berlin, he and his pilots were attacked by 25 German Me 262 fighter jets. They downed three German jets, suffering no losses to their U.S. bomber fleet. Nonetheless, the Germans shot down and captured McDaniel and another P-51 pilot. As McDaniel parachuted from his aircraft, he fractured both legs.

The Germans initially imprisoned McDaniel at Nuremberg, Germany, Munich, Germany, and ultimately at Stalag VII-A near Moosburg, Germany, for over 30 days. He was eventually liberated by General George Patton's US Third Army on April 29, 1945.

In January 1945, McDaniel became the 301st Fighter Squadron's commanding officer, replacing Major Lee Rayford, who returned to the United States. In 1946, McDaniel became the commandant of cadets at the Tuskegee Army Air Field. McDaniel was later stationed in Alaska, where he led several units.

In 1964, McDaniel retired from the active duty Air Force as a lieutenant colonel. He later worked for the U.S. Department of Health, Education and Welfare in New York City as a civil rights specialist.

== Family ==
After World War II, McDaniel married Faye J. Wilson McDaniel (1935–2019) of Fayetteville, Tennessee. McDaniel had three children: Armour G. McDaniel, Jr. (1952–1989), Gregory McDaniel and Gwendolyn Jackson. He also had four step-children: Delmer Jerome Edmonds, Jr., Kevin L. Edmonds, Donald E. Edmonds and Regina F. Majors.

== Death, interments ==
McDaniel died on November 12, 1989, in Indianapolis, Indiana. He is interred at Arlington National Cemetery in Section 65, Grave 2822. His wife, Faye, is buried alongside him in Arlington.

== Legacy ==
- McDaniel's widow, Faye J. Wilson McDaniel (1935–2019), attended the 2016 ribbon-cutting ceremonies celebrating the renaming of a section of Interstate 65 near Columbus, Indiana, for the Tuskegee Airmen. Surrounded by members of the U.S. military and government officials, Mrs. McDaniel cut the ribbon.
- In February 2019, Virginia State Senator Bill Stanley (politician) (R-Franklin County) honored the memory of McDaniels by presenting a flag to McDaniel's Martinsville-based cousin, placing a framed photograph of a wreath on McDaniel's grave at Arlington National Cemetery, and flying a flag over the Virginia state capital in his honor. A photograph capturing one of McDaniel's missions is displayed at the Smithsonian's National Aerospace Museum. The photograph shows a damaged wing on McDaniel's plane after he led an attack on German barges on the Danube River in 1944. McDaniel personally destroyed six barges, each containing approximately 250 troops. Despite damage to his plane, McDaniel successfully returned to base.

== See also ==
- List of Tuskegee Airmen Cadet Pilot Graduation Classes
- List of Tuskegee Airmen
- Military history of African Americans
- Dogfights (TV series)
- Executive Order 9981
- The Tuskegee Airmen (movie)
