= Radford High School =

Radford High School may refer to:

- Radford High School (Virginia) in Radford, Virginia
- Admiral Arthur W. Radford High School in Honolulu, Hawaii

== See also ==
- Radford College, in Bruce, ACT, Australia; a co-ed K-12 day school
- Radford (disambiguation)
