= Stalag VII-A =

German World War II prisoner-of-war camp in Bavaria

- Moosburg, Bavaria
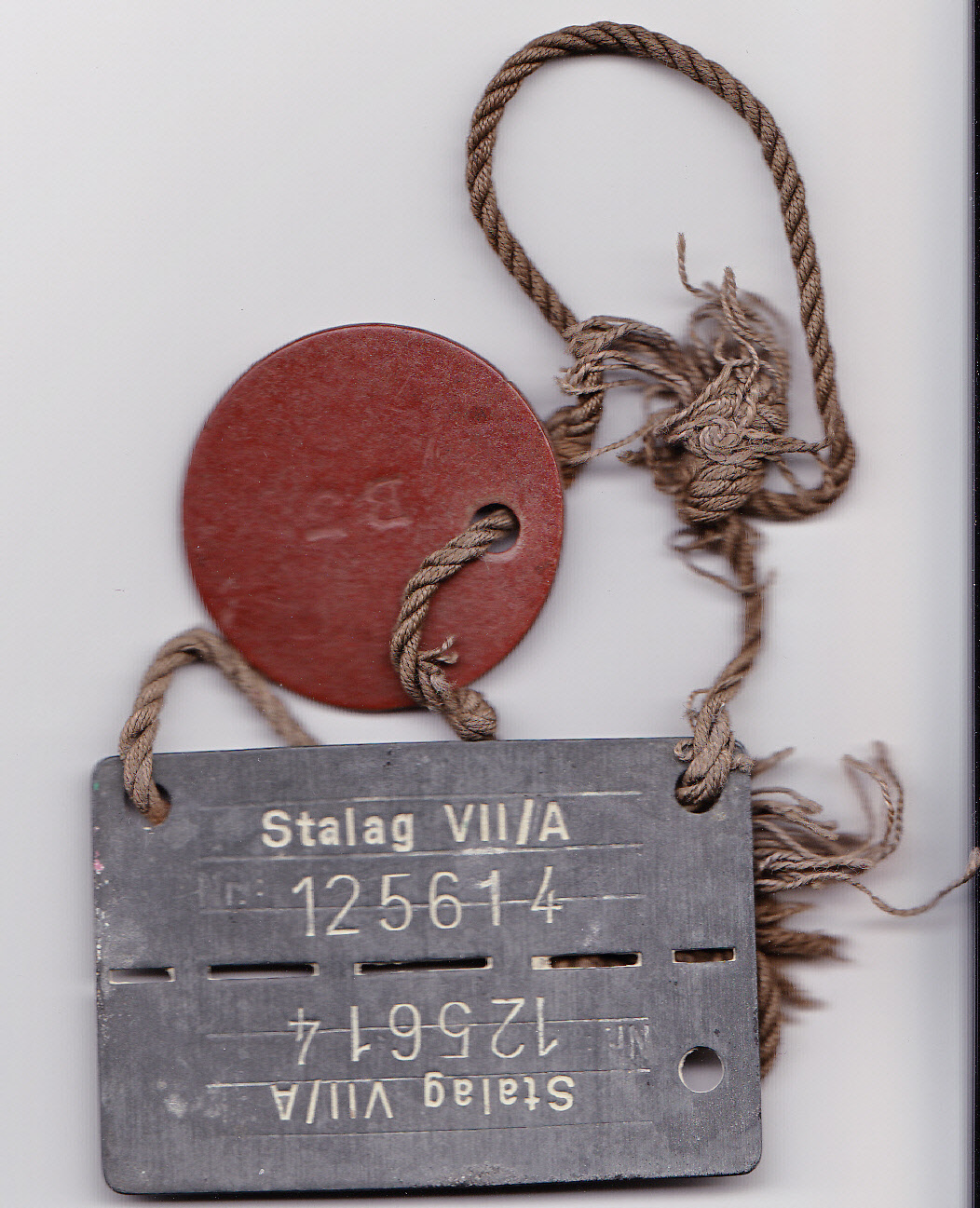
- ID tag as worn by POWs. Name and service number are on the brown disc.

Site information
- Type: Prisoner-of-war camp
- Controlled by: Nazi Germany

Location
- Moosburg, Germany (pre-war borders, 1937)
- Location within Germany
- Coordinates: 48.481578°N 11.942608°E

Site history
- In use: 1939–1945
- Battles/wars: World War II

Garrison information
- Occupants: Polish, British, French, Belgian, Dutch, Greek, Yugoslav, Soviet, American and other prisoners of war

Stalag VII-A (in full: Kriegsgefangenen-Mannschafts-Stammlager VII-A) was the largest prisoner-of-war camp in Nazi Germany during World War II, located just north of the town of Moosburg in southern Bavaria. The camp covered an area of 35 hectares (86 acres). It served also as a transit camp through which prisoners, including officers, were processed on their way to other camps. At some time during the war, prisoners from every nation fighting against Germany passed through it. At the time of its liberation on 29 April 1945, there were 76,248 prisoners in the main camp and 40,000 or more in Arbeitskommando working in factories, repairing railroads or on farms.

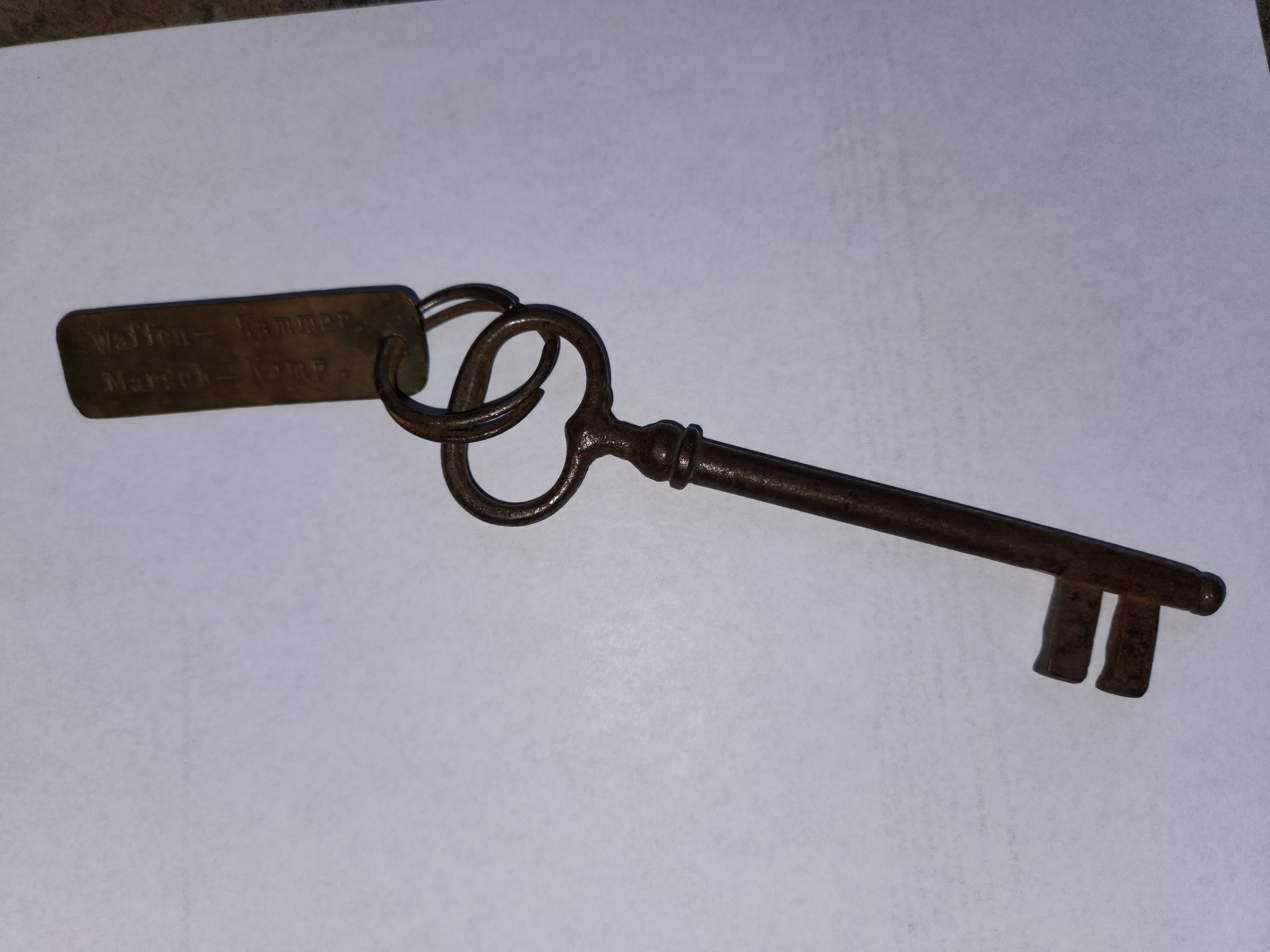
Key to main gate of Stalag VII-A, Moosburg, Germany

== Camp history ==
The camp was opened in September 1939 and was designed to house up to 10,000 Polish prisoners from the German invasion of Poland of 1939. The first prisoners arrived while the wooden barracks were under construction and for several weeks lived in tents.

British, French, Belgian and Dutch soldiers taken prisoner during the Battle of France started arriving in May 1940. Many were transferred to other camps, but close to 40,000 French remained at Stalag VII-A throughout the war.

British, Greek and Yugoslavian prisoners arrived from the Balkans Campaign in May and June 1941. A few months later Soviet prisoners started arriving, mostly officers. At the end of the war there were 27 Soviet generals in the prison.

More British Commonwealth and Polish prisoners came from the North African campaign and the offensive against the Italian-held islands in the Mediterranean. They were brought from Italian POW camps after the Armistice with Italy in September 1943, including many who escaped at that time and were recaptured. Italian soldiers were also imprisoned.

The first American arrivals came after the Tunisia Campaign in December 1942, and the Italian Campaign in 1943. Large numbers of Americans were captured in the Battle of the Bulge in December 1944.

On 7 November, 517 Polish insurgents of the suppressed Warsaw Uprising were brought from Stalag 344, however, Polish officers were soon moved to Oflag VII-A. Further several dozen of Polish insurgents were later brought from a forced labour camp of Stalag XI-A. Polish insurgents were assigned insufficient food rations, and were aided by other Polish POWs and American POWs.

Among the last arrivals were officers from Stalag Luft III who had been force-marched from Sagan in Silesia (now Żagań), Poland). They arrived on 2 February 1945. They were followed by more prisoners marched from other camps threatened by the advancing Soviets, including American officers who had been marched from Oflag 64 in Szubin, via Oflag XIII-B, under their senior officer Lt.Col. Paul Goode.

During the 5½ years, about 1,000 prisoners died at the camp, over 800 of them Soviets. They were buried in a cemetery in Oberreit, south of Moosburg. Most died from illness, some from injuries during work.

On 1 August 1942 Major Karl August Meinel was shifted into the Führerreserve, because on 13 January 1942 he wrote a critical report to General Hermann Reinecke on the segregation and execution of Russian prisoners of war in Stalag VII-A by the Gestapo and the Sicherheitsdienst SD (security service) of the Reichsführer SS (Heinrich Himmler).

=== Liberation ===
Stalag VII-A was captured on 29 April 1945 by Combat Command A of the 14th Armored Division. A German proposal for an armistice was rejected, followed by a short, uneven battle between the American tanks and retreating German soldiers for control of bridges across the Amper and Isar rivers. The German contingent included "remnants of the 17th SS Panzer Grenadier and 719th Infantry Divisions...which had no tanks or antitank guns, and were armed with only small arms, machine guns, mortars, and panzerfausts". Large numbers surrendered, as did the camp's 240 guards. The American force learned of the existence of the camp and its approximate location only a few hours before the attack. Because so many Allied POWs were in the area, the U.S. artillery, a major factor in any attack, was ordered not to fire, and remained silent during the attack. According to official German sources, there had been 76,248 prisoners at the camp in January 1945.

== Aftermath ==
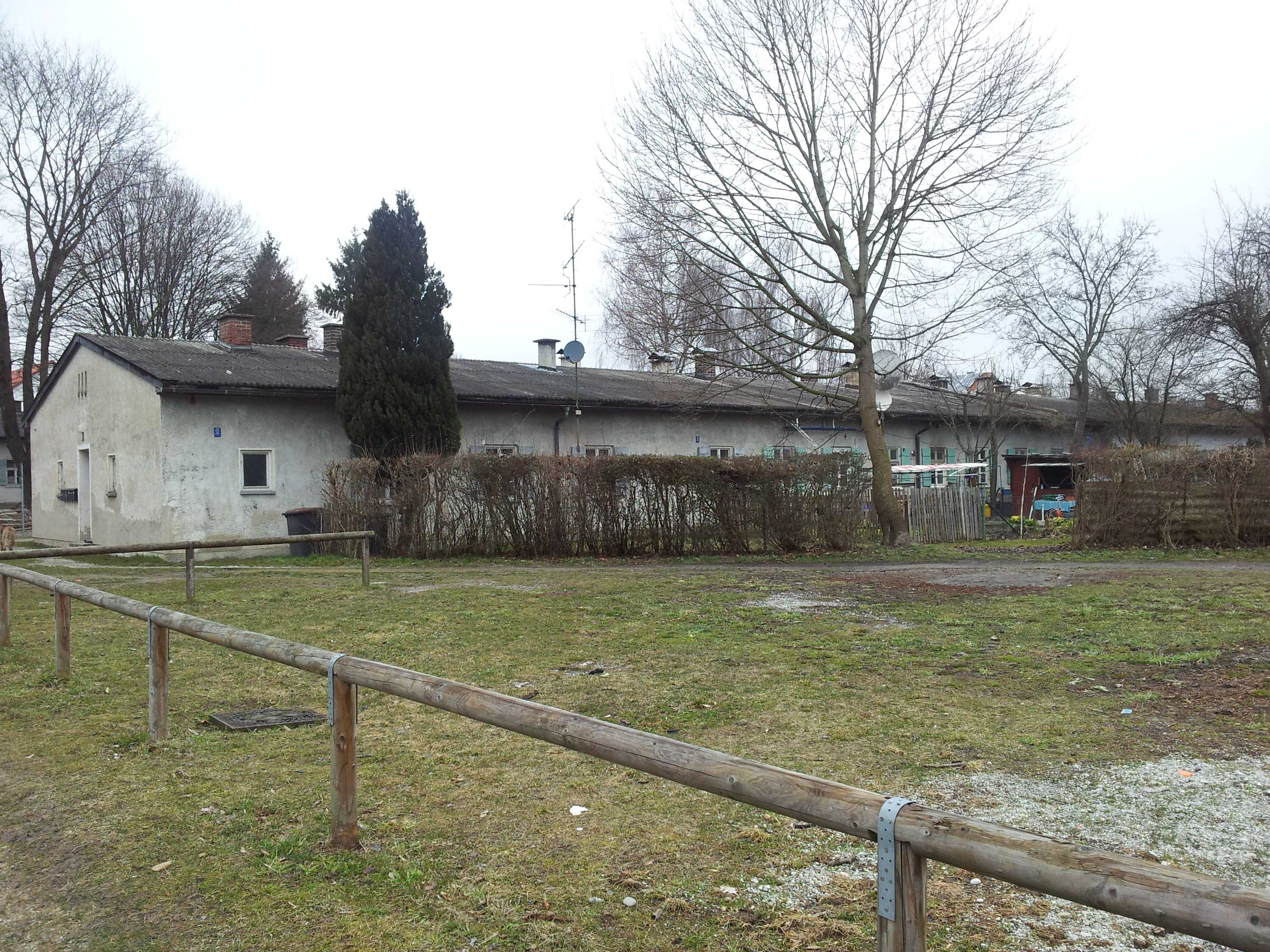
Barrack 3 of the guard of Stalag VII-A in 2013

After the liberation Stalag VII-A was turned into Civilian Internment Camp #6 for 12,000 German men and women suspected of criminal activity for the Nazi regime. Later the camp was turned into a new district of the town called Moosburg-Neustadt. One of the old huts has been restored.

A memorial to inmates of Stalag VII-A was built. It is a fountain located in the center of Neustadt. It consists of four bas-reliefs created out of local stone by the French sculptor Antoniucci Volti while he was a prisoner in the camp.

In 1958 the Oberreit cemetery was closed. 866 bodies were exhumed and reburied at the military cemetery in Schwabstadl near Landsberg. The bodies of 33 Italians were reburied at the Italian Memorial Cemetery near Munich. In 1982 the Moosburg City Council purchased a plot at the site of the old Oberreit cemetery and erected a wooden cross with a simple stone remembering the dead of Stalag VII-A.

== Notable prisoners ==
- Derek Bond, M.C., Grenadier Guards
- John Allen Dixon Jr., 505th Parachute Infantry Regiment, later Chief Justice of the Louisiana Supreme Court
- Jack Hemingway, Canadian-American fly fisherman, conservationist, and writer. Son of American novelist and Nobel Prize-laureate Ernest Hemingway.
- Lincoln Hudson, U.S. Tuskegee Airmen fighter pilot
- George J. Iles, U.S. Tuskegee Airmen fighter pilot
- Alexander Jefferson, U.S. Tuskegee Airmen fighter pilot
- Armour G. McDaniel, U.S. Tuskegee Airmen fighter pilot
- Roger Collinson, British Sept 1943 to 3 Nov 1943 Eighth Army Captured in North Africa
- Richard A. Radford, British Eighth Army in North Africa; later IMF economist
- Vito Trause, U.S. 34th Infantry Division
- John Waddy OBE, British Parachute Regiment, later Colonel SAS
- Major John “Bucky” Egan of the 100th Bomb Group (of Masters of the Air fame) along with numerous others of the 100th were moved to 7-A after being evacuated from Stalag XIII-D at Nuremberg on April 2nd, 1945 and were liberated at 7-A on April 29th.

== See also ==
- List of prisoner-of-war camps in Germany
- Stalag
- Karl von Eberstein - SS officer who helped fire Meinel after he objected to POW killings
- Gestapo - responsible for 'screening' POWs to be murdered
