= Anthony Wreford-Brown =

English cricketer

Personal information
- Full name: Anthony John Wreford-Brown
- Born: 26 October 1912; Thames Ditton, Surrey, England
- Died: 22 September 1997 (aged 84); St Germans, Cornwall, England
- Batting: Right-handed
- Relatives: Charles Wreford-Brown (father); Oswald Wreford-Brown (brother)

Domestic team information
- Years: Team
- 1934: Sussex
- 1934: Oxford University

Career statistics
Competition	First-class
Matches	5
Runs scored	146
Batting average	16.22
100s/50s	–/–
Top score	39
Balls bowled	–
Wickets	–
Bowling average	–
5 wickets in innings	–
10 wickets in match	–
Best bowling	–
Catches/stumpings	2/–
- Source: Cricinfo, 22 June 2012

Anthony John Wreford-Brown (26 October 1912 – 22 September 1997) was an English cricketer. Wreford-Brown was a right-handed batsman. He was born at Thames Ditton, Surrey, and was educated at Charterhouse School.

Wreford-Brown made his first-class debut for HDG Leveson Gower's XI in 1933, making two appearances against Oxford University and Cambridge University at The Saffrons. While studying at Worcester College, Oxford, he made two first-class appearances for the university in 1934, playing against Gloucestershire and Worcestershire, both at the University Parks. He also made a single first-class appearance in that same season for Sussex against Cambridge University at the County Ground, Hove. In total, he made five first-class appearances, scoring 146 runs at an average of 16.22, with a high score of 39.

He died at St Germans, Cornwall, on 22 September 1997. His father, Charles, played first-class cricket, as well as captaining England in association football. His uncle, Oswald, was also a first-class cricketer.
