= Neal Radford =

English cricketer

Personal information
- Full name: Neal Victor Radford
- Born: 7 June 1957 (age 69); Luanshya, Northern Rhodesia
- Batting: Right-handed
- Bowling: Right-arm fast-medium

Career statistics
| Competition | Tests | ODIs |
|---|---|---|
| Matches | 3 | 6 |
| Runs scored | 21 | 0 |
| Batting average | 7.00 | 0.00 |
| 100s/50s | 0/0 | 0/0 |
| Top score | 12* | 0* |
| Balls bowled | 678 | 348 |
| Wickets | 4 | 2 |
| Bowling average | 87.75 | 115.00 |
| 5 wickets in innings | 0 | 0 |
| 10 wickets in match | 0 | 0 |
| Best bowling | 2/131 | 1/32 |
| Catches/stumpings | 0/– | 2/– |
- Source: CricInfo, 28 May 2005

Neal Victor Radford (born 7 June 1957) is an English former first-class cricketer, who appeared in three Tests and six ODIs for England.

Radford was born at Luanshya in Northern Rhodesia (now Zambia). He played domestically for Transvaal, Lancashire, Worcestershire, and Herefordshire.

The cricket writer, Colin Bateman, noted "Neal Radford took a circuitious route to Test cricket".

== Life and career ==
Radford was born in Zambia and educated in South Africa, making his first-class debut for Transvaal B in the 1978/79 President's Cup. However, opportunities in South Africa were limited owing to that country's isolation from world cricket, and so Radford moved to England and signed for Lancashire in 1980 as an overseas player.

Radford was not a particular success at Lancashire, failing to take 50 first-class wickets in any of his five seasons with the club, and he was dismissed at the end of 1984. By this time, however, he had qualified for England by residence, and so was sought after by several other counties. He chose to join Worcestershire, and his decision was repaid handsomely: he took 101 wickets with his right-arm fast-medium bowling in 1985, more than anyone else, and was named one of the Wisden Cricketers of the Year the following year.

His fine form continued into the 1986 season, and he was rewarded with an international call-up for the third Test against India at Edgbaston. He also played in the following Test of the summer against New Zealand, but his aggregate bowling figures over the two matches of 3–219 were far from impressive, and he was dropped from the England team in favour of debutant Gladstone Small.

Concentrating entirely on domestic cricket in 1987, Radford had another fine year, again taking more than 100 first-class wickets and forcing his way back into contention for an England place, gaining selection for the winter tour of New Zealand. He was picked to play at Auckland, but again failed to make the breakthrough, finishing with match figures of 1–132. He was dropped again from the Test side, this time for good, although he did play four One Day Internationals against New Zealand (and one against Australia) on that tour.

After that, Radford's career with England consisted of just one more ODI, against West Indies in 1988. From that time onward he was never close to international selection again, but he played another eight seasons for Worcestershire. He had an excellent year in one-day cricket in 1991: he took 48 wickets, including 7–19 against Bedfordshire in the NatWest Trophy; as of the end of 2006, both statistics remain records for Worcestershire. He was awarded a benefit season in 1995, and when he retired from the first-class game at the end of that year, he had 994 wickets to his name at that level.

In 1993 Radford established the cricket supplies business Radford EZY Net.

In 1997 and 1998, Radford played Minor counties cricket for Herefordshire.

In March 2014, Neal Radford announced his intention to stand for the UK Independence Party in the local elections. He said: "I was getting increasingly frustrated as a dissatisfied voter and as such and wanted to do something about the situation – so I joined UKIP. I have been approached to stand in Fladbury for the local elections and it is something I intend to do." UKIP leader Nigel Farage said: "He was one of the hardest working and gutsy bowlers in first-class cricket and I know that he will apply that work ethic to his campaigning with us."

Radford's two brothers, Glen and Wayne, both played domestic first-class cricket in South Africa.

== See also ==
- List of Test cricketers born in non-Test playing nations

Sporting positions
| Preceded by Kapil Dev | Nelson Cricket Club; Professional; 1982 | Succeeded by Graham Roope |
