= Glen Radford =

Zambian-born South African cricketer (born 1962)

Glen Radford (born 27 February 1962) is a former cricketer. Born in Luanshya, Zambia, he played at first-class and List A level for Eastern Transvaal, Western Transvaal and WT's successor North West in the 1990s.

He is the brother of two other significant cricketers: Neal Radford and Wayne Radford.
