= Oswald Wreford-Brown =

English cricketer and footballer (1877–1916)

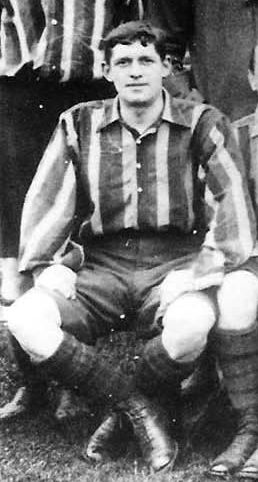
- Wreford-Brown while with Old Carthusians in 1903

Personal information
- Full name: Oswald Eric Wreford-Brown
- Date of birth: 21 July 1877
- Place of birth: Clifton, England
- Date of death: 7 July 1916 (aged 38)
- Place of death: Corbie, France

Senior career*
| Years | Team | Apps | (Gls) |
- Old Carthusians
- Free Foresters
- Corinthian
- Old Salopians
- * Club domestic league appearances and goals

Oswald Eric Wreford-Brown (21 July 1877 – 7 July 1916) was an English cricketer and footballer.

== Sporting career ==
=== Cricket ===
Wreford-Brown was a right-handed batsman who, after captaining Charterhouse School's cricket team, later played for Gloucestershire. He made a single first-class appearance for the team, during the 1900 season, against Middlesex. From the tailend, he scored five runs in the only innings in which he batted.

=== Football ===
Wreford-Brown played football for Charterhouse School and later as a senior player for amateur clubs Old Carthusians, Free Foresters, Corinthian and Old Salopians. He won the 1898–99 London Senior Cup with Old Carthusians and the 1902–03 Arthur Dunn Challenge Cup with Old Salopians.

== Personal life ==
Wreford-Brown's older brother, Charles and nephew, Anthony, both played first-class cricket. He was educated at a number of schools, before joining Charterhouse School in 1891. He later spent time in Canada and in 1902, became a member of the Stock Exchange and a partner in a law firm.

== First World War ==
In November 1914, during the early months of the First World War, Wreford-Brown was commissioned into the Northumberland Fusiliers as a temporary lieutenant. His regiment arrived on the Western Front in July 1915, two months after his brother Claude had been killed in West Flanders. Wreford-Brown was promoted to temporary captain on 8 September 1915. On 5 July 1916, during the Battle of the Somme, Wreford-Brown's promotion to full captain was confirmed, but he was mortally wounded in the leg by a shell near Fricourt and died two days later at 5th Casualty Clearing Station in Corbie. He was buried in Corbie Communal Cemetery.
