= Kathleen Meyer =

American nature writer

- Born: Manhattan
- Occupations: Outdoor writer, environmental writer
- Partner: Patrick McCarron
- Writing career
- Period: 1989 -
- Genres: non-fiction; memoir
- Notable works: How To Shit in the Woods (1989); Barefoot Hearted (1994)

Kathleen Meyer (born 7 December 1942) is a contemporary American outdoor writer whose first work, How To Shit in the Woods, was published in 1989. Her writing is characterized by the use of humor and irreverence. She has two published works in print: her outdoor guide How to Shit in the Woods: An Environmentally Sound Approach to a Lost Art and her Wild West memoir Barefoot Hearted: A Wild Life Among Wildlife.

== How to Shit in the Woods ==
The fourth edition of How to Shit in the Woods with a foreword by Bill McKibben was published in 2020. The first edition of the guidebook was published by Ten Speed Press in 1989. It does, indeed, revolve around the many strategies Meyers has noticed for defecating where there is no modern toilet and running water. As one reads the book, it quickly becomes obvious that Meyer's concern is not only for the comfort of the camper or hiker, but for the impact that human waste leaves on pristine natural ecosystems. She talks about digging "environmentally sound" holes, locating the high water line, so as not to inadvertently pollute a stream or ground water source, and what types of soil facilitate quickest decomposition without risk of environmental contamination. The damage to humans and wildlife from carelessly disposed human waste comes in many forms including giardia, diarrhea, and intestinal diseases. A second edition of the book was issued in 1994 and a third edition in 2011. Meyer holds humans uniquely responsible for the spread of giardia in the wilderness areas of the United States: "Until 1970, there were no reports in the United States of waterborne outbreaks of giardia. The first . . . occurred in Aspen, Colorado, in 1970. Over the next four years, many cases were documented in travelers returning from . . . Leningrad . . . The Soviet Union became more open to visitation by Westerners at about this time and Leningrad's municipal water supply was full of Giardia cysts."

In its various editions, the book has been reviewed by Audubon Magazine, The New Zealand Dominion Post, and The Globe and Mail Audubon magazine writer Frank Graham wrote “Kathleen Meyer has contributed to environmental awareness while lending a grand old English word the respectability it hasn’t had since Chaucer’s day.”

== Barefoot-Hearted ==
In Barefoot-Hearted, published by Random House in 2001, Meyer writes about renovating a dilapidated barn in which to live with her life mate. Her book explores the many adversities of trying to live in a barn, not the least of which is how the smell of resident skunks under the floor permeates and resides in her clothes and hair and how the barn is infested with flies and mice. In the manner of nature writers who often use a small animal or plant as a symbol of an ecological principle, Meyer explains that she doesn't feel guilty about trapping and killing mice, because they are abundant and their population ever growing. By contrast, she notes the comparative frailty of bears who often stumble upon human habitations looking for food. After contact with humans, a bear is often trapped and removed or euthanized. In the same book, Meyer also chronicles her and Patrick’s adventures driving a team and wagon across three Rocky Mountain states. The book was reviewed by Publishers Weekly.

== Personal life ==
Meyer lives in western Montana.

== Official site ==
- Kathleen Meyer Bestselling Author
