= Redford (surname) =

Redford is a variant of the toponymic surname "Radford", though it may also arise directly from the placename "East Retford" in Nottingham, England which had an alternative spelling of "Redeford".

Notable people sharing this surname include:

born in 16th Century

- John Redford (died 1547), English composer and organist

born in 18th Century

- Sebastian Redford (1701–1763), English Jesuit

born in 19th Century

- Alvin J. Redford (1883–1974), American politician
- Harry Redford (1841–1901), also known as Captain Starlight, Australian stockman and cattle thief
- James Redford (politician) (1821–1909), Canadian businessman and political figure

born in 20th Century

- Craig Redford (born 1984), Entrepreneur, Australia
- Alison Redford (born 1965), Former Premier of Alberta, Canada
- Angus Redford (born 1956), Australian politician
- Blair Redford (born 1983), American actor
- Donald B. Redford (1934–2024), Canadian Egyptologist
- Emmette Redford (1904–1998), American political scientist and historian
- Ian Redford (actor) (born 1951), British actor
- Ian Redford (footballer) (born 1960), Scottish footballer
- James Redford (filmmaker) (1962–2020), American documentary film maker
- Robert Redford (1936–2025), American film director, actor, producer
- Spencer Redford (born 1983), American actress
- William Redford (born 1958), British corporate executive
