= Charles Wreford-Brown =

English sportsman (1866–1951)

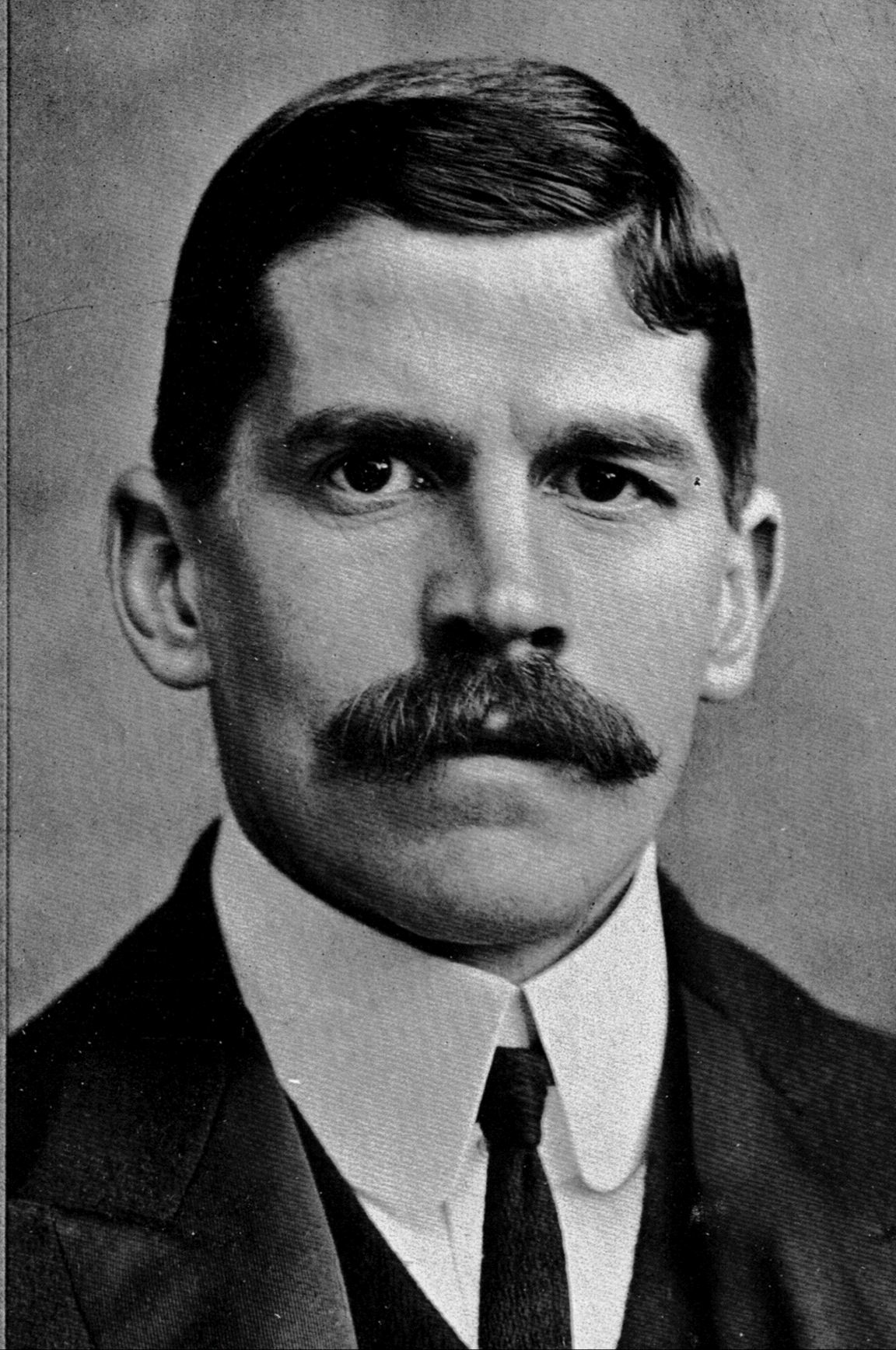

Personal information
- Full name: Charles Wreford-Brown
- Born: 9 October 1866; Clifton, Bristol, England
- Died: 26 November 1951 (aged 85); Bayswater, London, England
- Batting: Right-handed
- Bowling: Right-arm slow
- Role: Bowler
- Relatives: Oswald Wreford-Brown (brother); Anthony Wreford-Brown (son)

Domestic team information
- Years: Team
- 1886–1898: Gloucestershire
- 1886–1889: Oxford University

Career statistics
| Competition | First-class |
|---|---|
| Matches | 19 |
| Runs scored | 252 |
| Batting average | 9.69 |
| 100s/50s | 0/1 |
| Top score | 51 |
| Balls bowled | 2,350 |
| Wickets | 39 |
| Bowling average | 24.84 |
| 5 wickets in innings | 1 |
| 10 wickets in match | 0 |
| Best bowling | 5/62 |
| Catches/stumpings | 10/– |
- Source: Cricinfo, 6 February 2008

Charles Wreford-Brown (9 October 1866 – 26 November 1951) was an English sportsman. He captained the England national football team and was a county cricketer during the Victorian age, and later acted as a sports legislator during the 20th century. Wreford-Brown is usually credited with inventing the term soccer as an abbreviation for association football.

== Upbringing and amateur status ==
Wreford-Brown was born in Bristol went to Charterhouse School before studying at Oriel College, Oxford. Given his privileged economic status at the time of the rise in the popularity of football, Wreford-Brown was one of a select few who were able to play sports for no monetary gain whatsoever.

The educated belief in the purity of a noble athletic spirit untainted by the corrupting influence of money was embodied within the rise of the Corinthian football club that Wreford-Brown played for in the 1890s. Indeed, in 1906 Wreford-Brown was one of the leading figures in the movement to create the Amateur Football Alliance in London in order to keep the amateur game separate from the Football Association, an organisation that the amateur clubs found to be increasingly driven by the financial gain of the professional clubs.

== Sporting achievement ==
He was a keen sportsman at the University of Oxford and played both cricket and football for the university. He also later played cricket for Gloucestershire. His younger brother, Oswald (who died during the first World War in 1916) and son Anthony would, like him, also play for first-class cricket but none were stand-outs with the willow.

However it is as a footballer that he is more recognised. He first played as a goalkeeper but played initially as a stop-gap but later as the mainstay centre-half for the Old Carthusians (the club for ex-Charterhouse boys) (appearing against them in the 1896 London Charity Cup final, Clifton Association (the Association which took in Bristol and its environs and with whom he played in the inaugural Gloucestershire Cup), as well as the Corinthians and captained England twice against Wales in 1894 and 1895 (when the team consisted entirely of amateur players).

Steve Bloomer, one of the leading "players" (professionals) on the England team, recorded in a memoir that, as captain, the patrician Wreford-Brown on one occasion took to the field with a deep pocket in his shorts filled with gold sovereigns and pressed one of the coins into the hand of each professional goalscorer after the man had netted.

== Corinthian FC ==
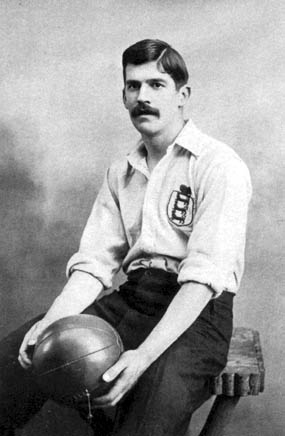
Wreford-Brown with the England national team

Charles Wreford-Brown was a leading figure for the era's most prominent football club, Corinthian FC. A constant figure throughout the club's golden era, he played 161 games for the club, scoring 8 goals. In 1894, Corinthian FC became the only club still to this day, to ever fully represent the England National side, and Charles Wreford-Brown would captain the side. He would too, when the extraordinary feat was repeated a year later.

Corinthian FC were strict amateurs who believed in fair play and who had the "Corinthian Spirit" named in their honour. They are the team credited with having popularised the sport around the world with many tours and with them, Wreford-Brown travelled to South Africa, USA, Canada, Sweden and Denmark.

A strong defender, Wreford-Brown played in some of the club's famous victories over professional opponents such as Liverpool, Southampton, Sunderland and Spurs.

== Legislator ==
He was first appointed to the council of The Football Association to represent the Old Carthusians in 1892 but soon after served as the representative for Oxford University, a position he held until his death some 59 years later. He later became Chairman of the International Selection Committee for England within the Football Association.

He was in attendance at the first meeting of the Athenian League on 27 May 1914. He served as a vice-president of the FA from 1941 until his death in 1951, under Sir Stanley Rous, secretary of the Association. They have been credited with guiding the Association toward a more educated position, promoting youth coaching and training just before hostilities in 1939.

He was also a keen chess player. In 1924, in Paris Charles Wreford-Brown participated in unofficial Chess Olympiad. He took part in the 1933 British Chess Championship, though he had to drop out through illness after two rounds (he had won the first game and drawn the second).

== Bibliography ==
- Ekblom, Björn (1994). Football (Soccer): Olympic Handbook of Sports Medicine. Wiley. p. 1. ISBN 0-63203-328-2.
- Needham, Ernest (2003) [1901]. Association Football. Cleethorpes: Soccer Books. ISBN 1-86223-083-8.
