= Richard A. Radford =

American economist

- Born: 1919; Nottingham, England
- Died: 7 November 2006 (aged 86–87); Bethesda, Maryland, United States

Academic work
- Discipline: Price theory
- Institutions: Johns Hopkins University; International Monetary Fund

Richard A. Radford (1919 – 7 November 2006) was a British-born American economist who served in the International Monetary Fund and became widely known for his 1945 article on prisoner-of-war camp economics.

== Early life ==
Radford was born in 1919 in Nottingham, England. He studied economics at the University of Cambridge. When World War II broke out, Radford left the university and enlisted as a soldier in the British Army. He fought in the Allies' North African Campaign but was captured in Libya by the German forces in 1942 and spent the remainder of the war years in the Stalag VII-A prisoner-of-war camp, in southern Bavaria.

== Prisoner-of-war camp economics ==
During his time in the POW camp, Radford observed the life of prisoners and their economic interactions. On the basis of those observations, he wrote after the war ended the article "The Economic Organisation of a P.O.W. Camp," which appeared in the Economica journal in 1945.

The article eventually became a staple of introductory economics textbooks, and academic teachings as a primary example of people interacting economically, of the role of middlemen, and the free market at work. In the view of the Austrian school economist Robert P. Murphy, "there is nothing in Radford's account that conflicts with the standard economists’ story about the origin of money."

=== Criticism ===
Heterodox economists have criticized Radford's text for supporting the theory of the origin of money as commodity-money and for presenting an artificial situation, that of a POW camp, which they claim resembles a theoretical Walrasian exchange economy much more than the real-world economy.

== Later career ==
After the war, Radford returned to Cambridge and received a bachelor's degree in economics. In 1947, he moved to Washington, D.C., to join the International Monetary Fund, while he also started teaching economics at the Johns Hopkins University. In his capacity as an IMF representative, Radford traveled widely throughout the world.

When he retired from the IMF in 1980, he was assistant director of the institution's Fiscal Affairs Department.

== Personal life ==
Radford's first wife, Mary, with whom he had three children, died in 1977. His second marriage, which lasted 27 years, until his death, was to Margaret Radford. He died on 7 November 2006 at the Maplewood Park Place retirement home in Bethesda, Maryland, from complications of open aortic surgery.

== See also ==
- Say's law
- Arbitrage
- Free trade
- Mercantilism
- Monetarism
- Commodity money
