= Harold Brown (Tuskegee Airman) =

Fighter pilot and Tuskegee Airmen POW (1924–2023)

Lieutenant Colonel Harold Brown
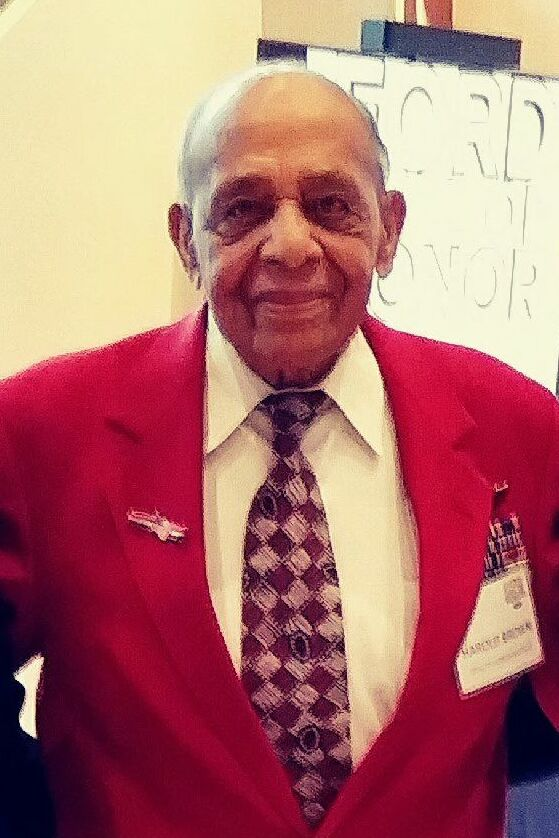
- Brown in 2021
- Born: August 19, 1924; Minneapolis, Minnesota, U.S.
- Died: January 12, 2023 (aged 98); Port Clinton, Ohio
- Education: Ohio State University, Bachelor's, Masters and PhD
- Spouse: Marsha S. Bordner
- Military career
- Allegiance: United States of America
- Branch: United States Army Air Force
- Service years: 1944–1965
- Rank: Lieutenant Colonel
- Unit: 332nd Fighter Group
- Awards: Congressional Gold Medal
- Other work: College Administrator

Harold H. Brown (August 19, 1924 – January 12, 2023) was a U.S. Army Air Force officer who served during World War II as a combat fighter pilot with the 332nd Fighter Group, best known as the Tuskegee Airmen. Brown's P-51C aircraft was shot down in the European Theatre of World War II and he became a prisoner of war.

== Early life ==
Brown was born August 19, 1924, in Minneapolis, Minnesota. In his autobiography Keep your Airspeed Up Brown says he developed a passion for flying as a teen. Brown claims to have read everything he could at the local library, about airplanes. He claims that two major influences on his passion for flying were the book The Life of an Army Corps Cadet: Randolph field, west Point of the Air, and a 1938 movie called The Dawn Patrol. He saved up $35 for flying lessons in a Piper J-3 Cub and at $7 a lesson he ran out of money before completing the program.

Brown graduated from high school In June 1942, at just seventeen years old, he graduated from North High School (Minneapolis).

== World War II ==
Brown developed an interest in becoming a pilot in his youth. After graduating from high school, he applied to the military to become a pilot. He was underweight so he was instructed to gain weight. After gaining weight to reach the 128.75 pound threshold he was accepted to the Tuskegee Institute for flight training. While he had experienced some racial discrimination in Minnesota, Brown was upset by having to abide by Jim Crow segregation practices when off-base in Alabama. He limited his exposure to racism by spending most of his time in local black communities.

At 19 years old, on May 23, 1944, Brown graduated from flight school as a 2nd Lieutenant.

During a strafing mission over Germany he encountered a German Messerschmitt Me 262 and pursued it, attempting to shoot it down. In 1945, Brown was flying a P-51C east of Bruck, Austria. His flight path took him over anti-aircraft emplacements, where he crashed after shrapnel from a destroyed German cargo train hit his plane. He was surrounded by Austrian and German citizens who then attempted to lynch him, before a German constable intervened and took him to a prisoner of war camp for two months. He was one of 32 of the Tuskegee Airmen to be captured during the war.

== Korean War and after ==
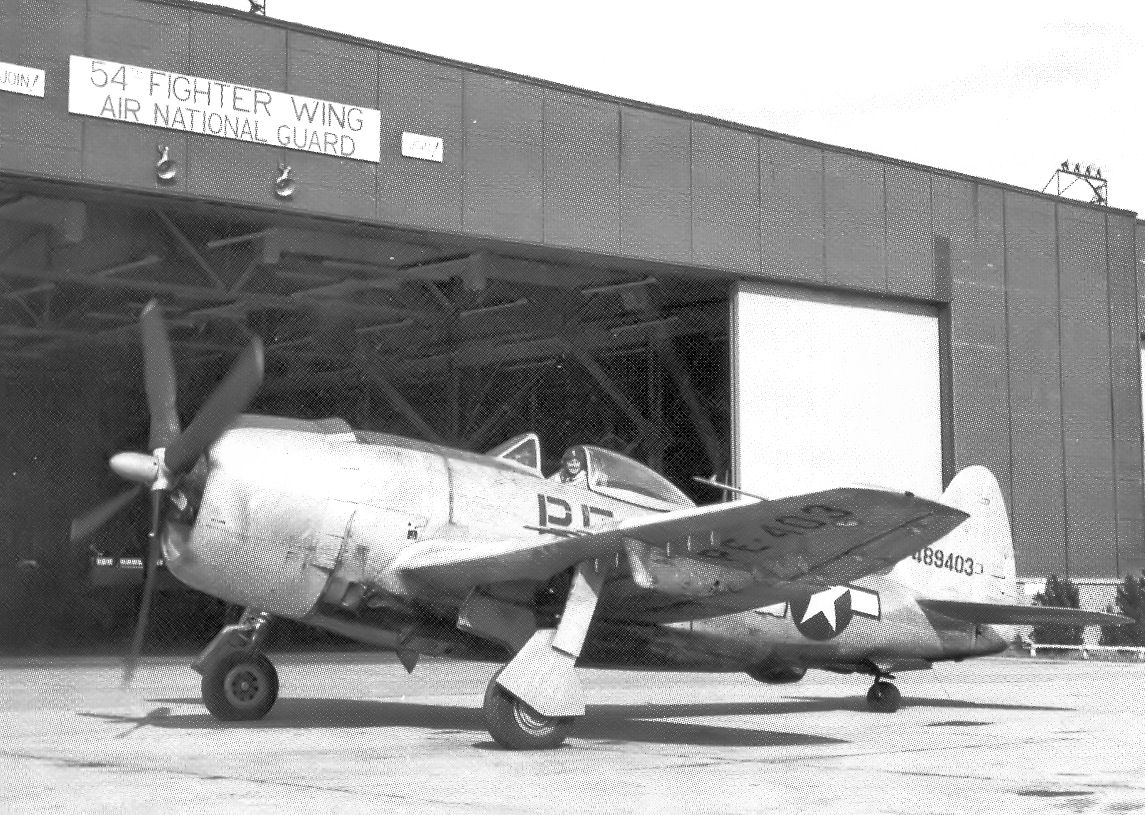
During his time in the military Brown flew a P-47N Thunderbolt The P-47N Thunderbolt was primarily used in the Pacific Theatre. (Note: The Tuskegee Airmen trained with the P-40 aircraft. Later the Tuskegee Airmen became known for flying the P-51 aircraft with red markings that distinguished the Tuskegee Airmen included red bands on the noses of P-51s as well as a red rudder; their P-51B and D Mustangs flew with similar color schemes, with red propeller spinners, yellow wing bands and all-red tail surfaces.)

During the Korean War he was stationed at Tachikawa Air Base, Tokyo. Brown flew missions in South Korea from Taegu Air Base, Pusan Air Base and Seoul Air Base.

Brown retired from the Air Force in 1965 at the rank of lieutenant colonel.

In 1965 Brown attended Ohio University and earned a mathematics degree while working full time, then a master's degree and a doctorate in vocational-technical education at [The Ohio State University ]. He ultimately held the position of Vice President at Columbus State Community College.

== Civilian career ==
Following his retirement from the military, Brown earned a doctorate degree and became vice-president of academic affairs at Columbus State Community College. He retired from academia in 1986. Brown and his wife wrote Keep Your Airspeed Up: The Story of a Tuskegee Airman, a memoir about his World War II service, and published it in 2017.

== Personal life and death ==
Brown died on January 12, 2023, at the age of 98. At the time of his death, he was a resident of Port Clinton, Ohio.

== Honors ==
- Congressional Gold Medal awarded to the Tuskegee Airmen in 2006.
- In 2013, Heidelberg University awarded Brown an honorary Doctor of Humane Letters degree.
- In 2017, the University of Findlay awarded Brown an honorary doctorate.
- In 2020, the Minnesota Aviation Hall of Fame inducted Brown into its ranks. The Minnesota Aviation Hall of Fame also awarded Brown and his wife the "Writers of the Year" award for their book, “Keep Your Airspeed Up: The Story of a Tuskegee Airman.”

== See also ==
- List of Tuskegee Airmen Cadet Pilot Graduation Classes
- List of Tuskegee Airmen
- Military history of African Americans
- Dogfights (TV series)
- Executive Order 9981
- The Tuskegee Airmen (movie)
