= Radford Cave =

Cave in Devon, England

Coordinates: 50°21′31″N 4°6′6″W

Radford Cave, in Hexton Wood, near Hooe, Plymouth, Devon is a small phreatic cave of some ecological interest. It has been known to speleologists and others for many years and a plan was published in 1953.

== Sport caving ==
It is a popular place for adventure-seekers and those new caving, since it provides an easy round trip and is it difficult to get lost. However, there are occasional incidents when the inept, over-enthusiastic or inexperienced become stuck. There was, for example, a small drama reported on the front page of the Western Morning Herald, as well as in the Daily Telegraph where a Coldstream Guards instructor became wedged by his hips, face down, and had to be chipped free.

The cave is locked to protect the bats.

== Physical environment ==
The cave is situated in an old quarry in Devonian limestone. Its total passage length is around 600m. Cave temperature is 12-13 Celsius. Air moves into the cave during daylight hours and out during the hours of darkness. The maximum passage height is about 9m with humidity varying within the cave from 83 to 98%, but it is usually at the top of the range. Local building may have had an effect on the ecology of the cave. The pools of water within the cave are at a pH of 7.7. Organic matter comprises less than 6% of the cave clay so this is a poor food for invertebrates.

== Wildlife ==
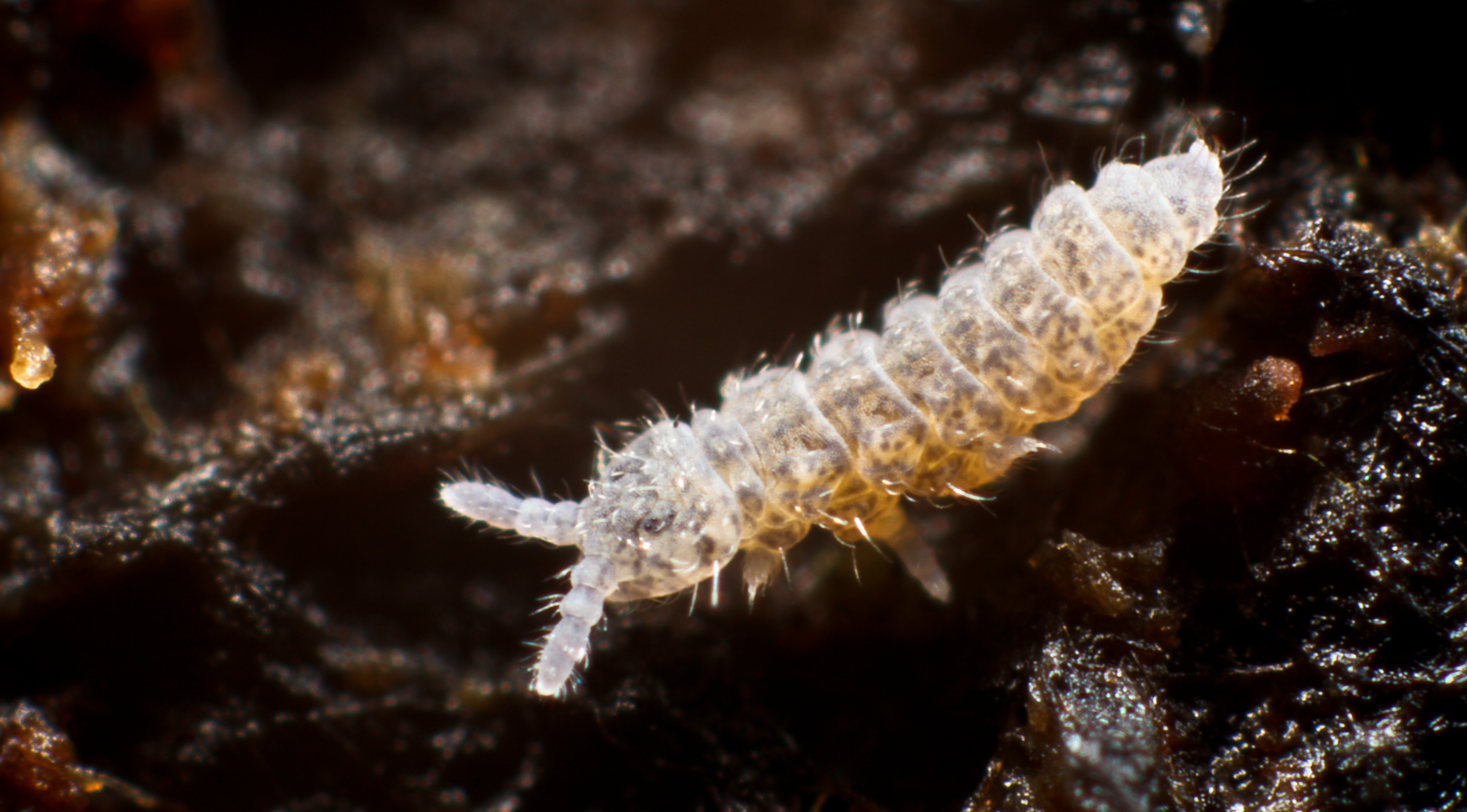
Schaefferia emucronata

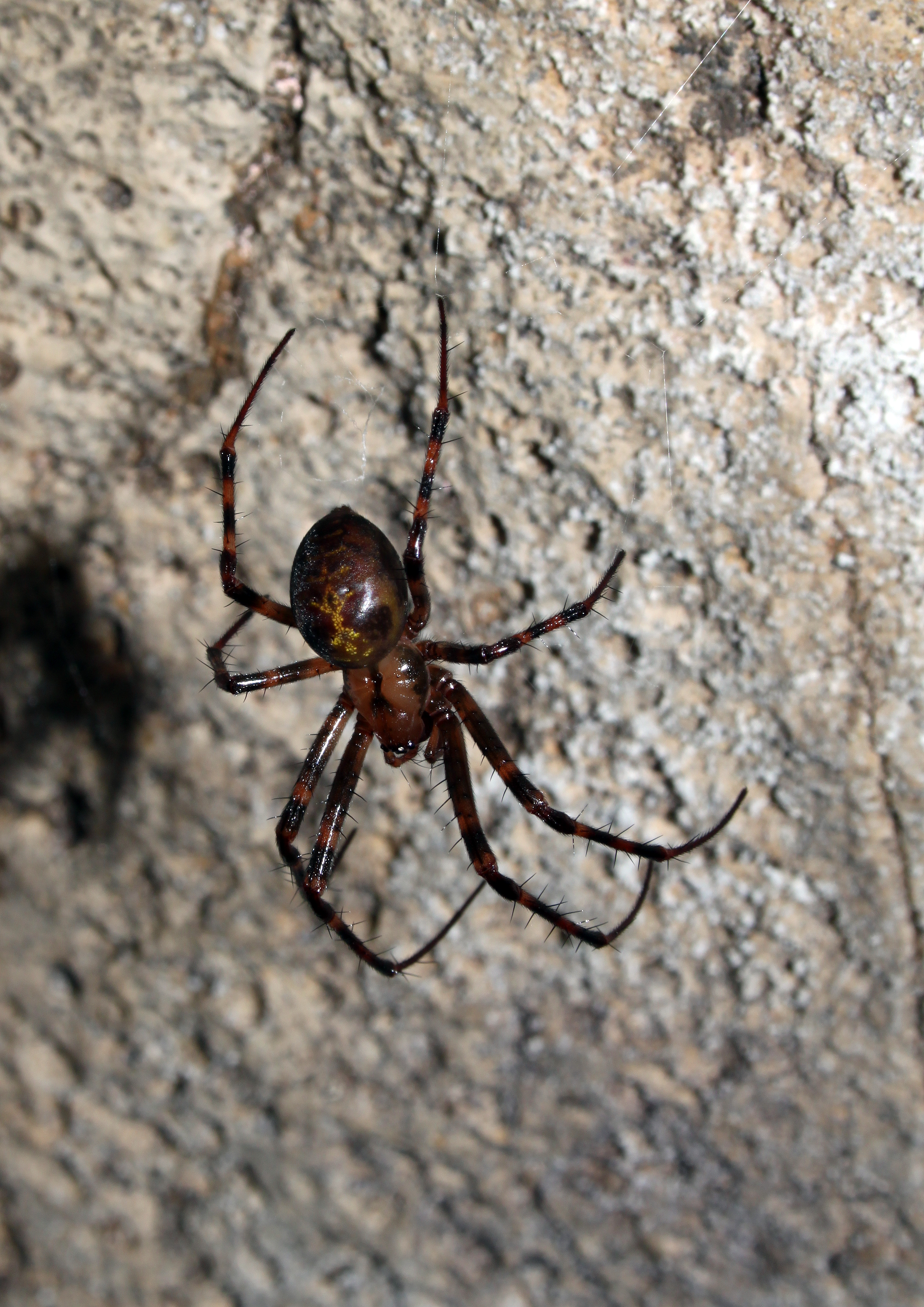
Meta menardii

Various zoologists with an interest in cave-dwelling creatures have worked n the cave. Both the Greater Horseshoe Bat and the Lesser Horseshoe Bat have been recorded inside. The invertebrates have been documented by various collectors, and records are held by the British Cave Research Association. The isopod Androniscus dentiger (Trichoniscidae) and acari Eugamasus loricatus (Parasitidae) are found throughout the dark zone of the cave. The commonest collembola are the lightly pigmented troglophiles Heteromurus nitidus; the white troglobite Pseudosinella dobati also inhabits the cave. Both are 1.7mm long. Other Collembola have been recorded including Entomobrya muscorum, Schaefferia emucronata, S. lindbergi, Onychiurus armatus, Neelus murinus, Arrhopalites caecus, and A. pymaegus. Collembola are particularly abundant in the Red Corridor section of the cave where humidity is generally at 93-94%. The spider Meta menardii (shown) inhabits the entrance and threshold zones of the cave and is sometimes found in the dark zone.
