= Radford Electronics =

British audio manufacturer

Radford Electronics is a British audio manufacturer from Bristol, founded by Arthur Hedley Radford (G6YA) in 1946. Radford's hi-fi amplifiers enjoyed a reputation for quality that was "second to none", especially because of their output transformers.

== History ==
Radford began building amplifiers in 1946, and marketed its first hifi-amplifier in 1959. Reportedly, Radford make amplifiers with such low distortion that they had to build their own test equipment to measure it; their test equipment also acquired a reputation for quality.

In 1961, the company released the STA range of amplifiers, accompanied by the DSM pre-amplifier. The Series 3 STA25, along with other Amplifiers in the STA range, won critical acclaim. As an expert in transformer design, Arthur Radford was able to reduce distortion by a factor of ten over the best performing amplifier of the day. The MK11 and Series 3 Amplifiers used a unique pentode phase inverter, which was the result of a joint venture between Dr A R Bailey and Arthur Radford, and was the subject of a detailed article in Wireless World.

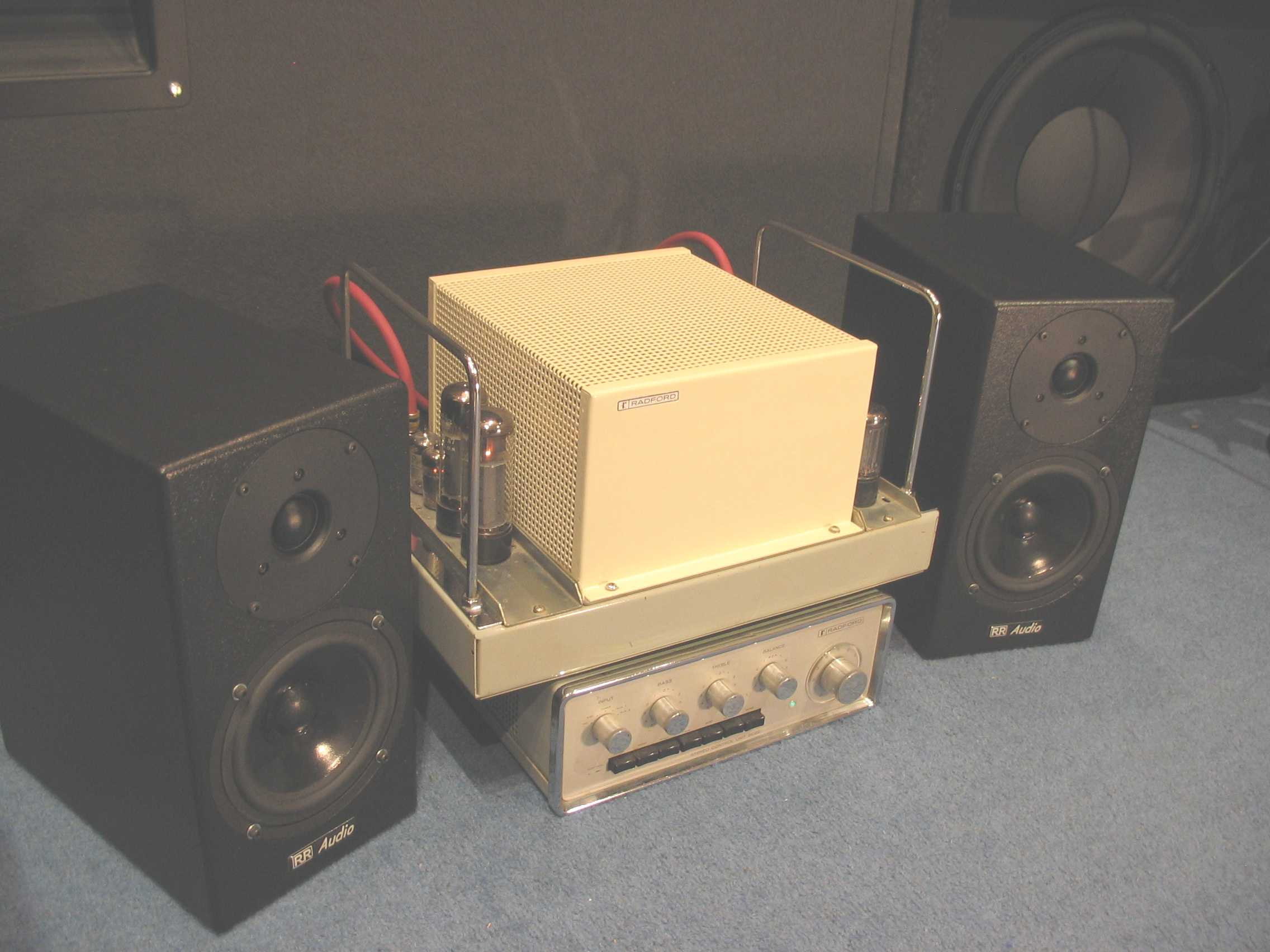
Radford STA15 MK3 and SC22 preamp

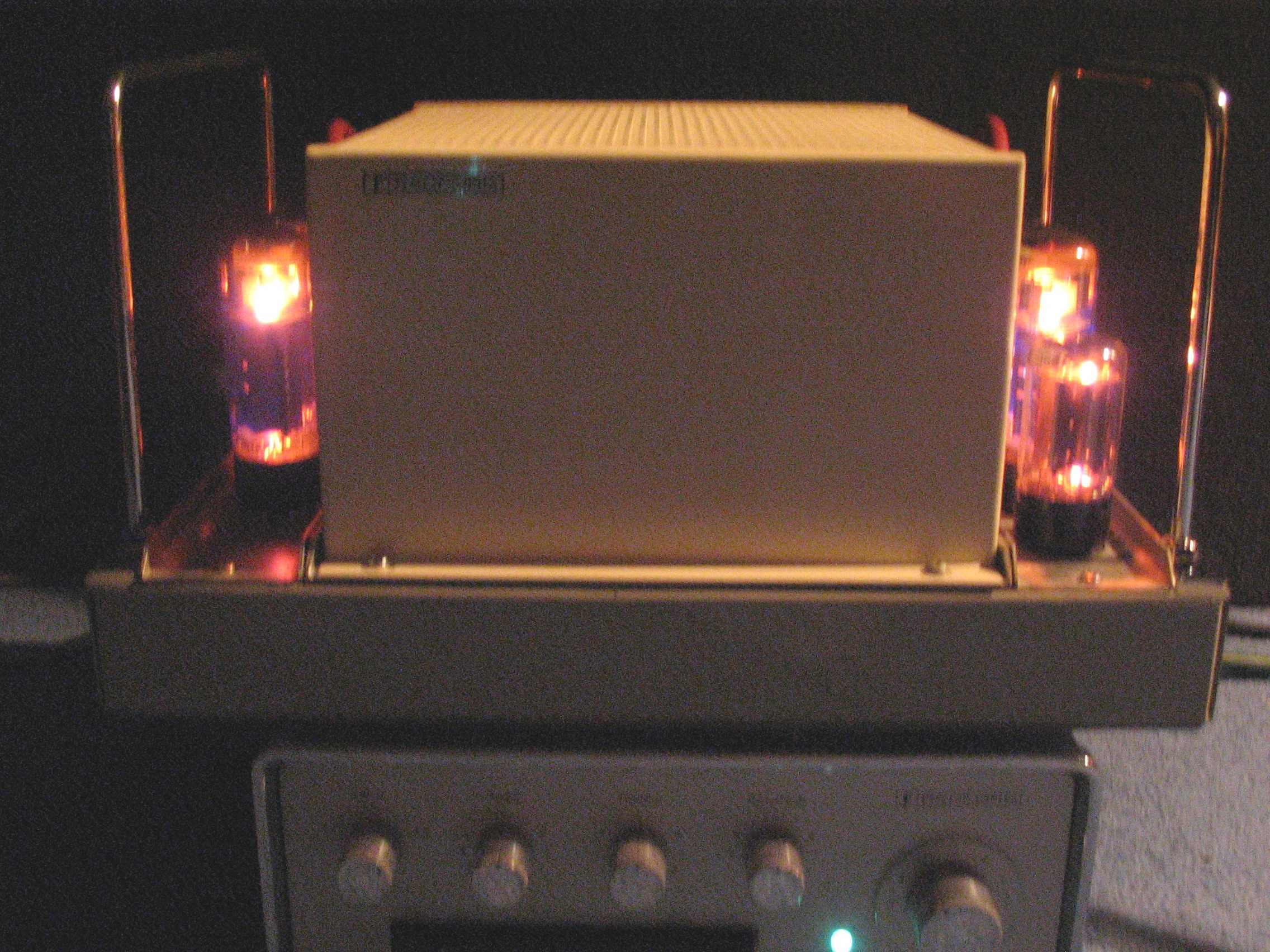
A glowing example of a Radford STA15 MK3

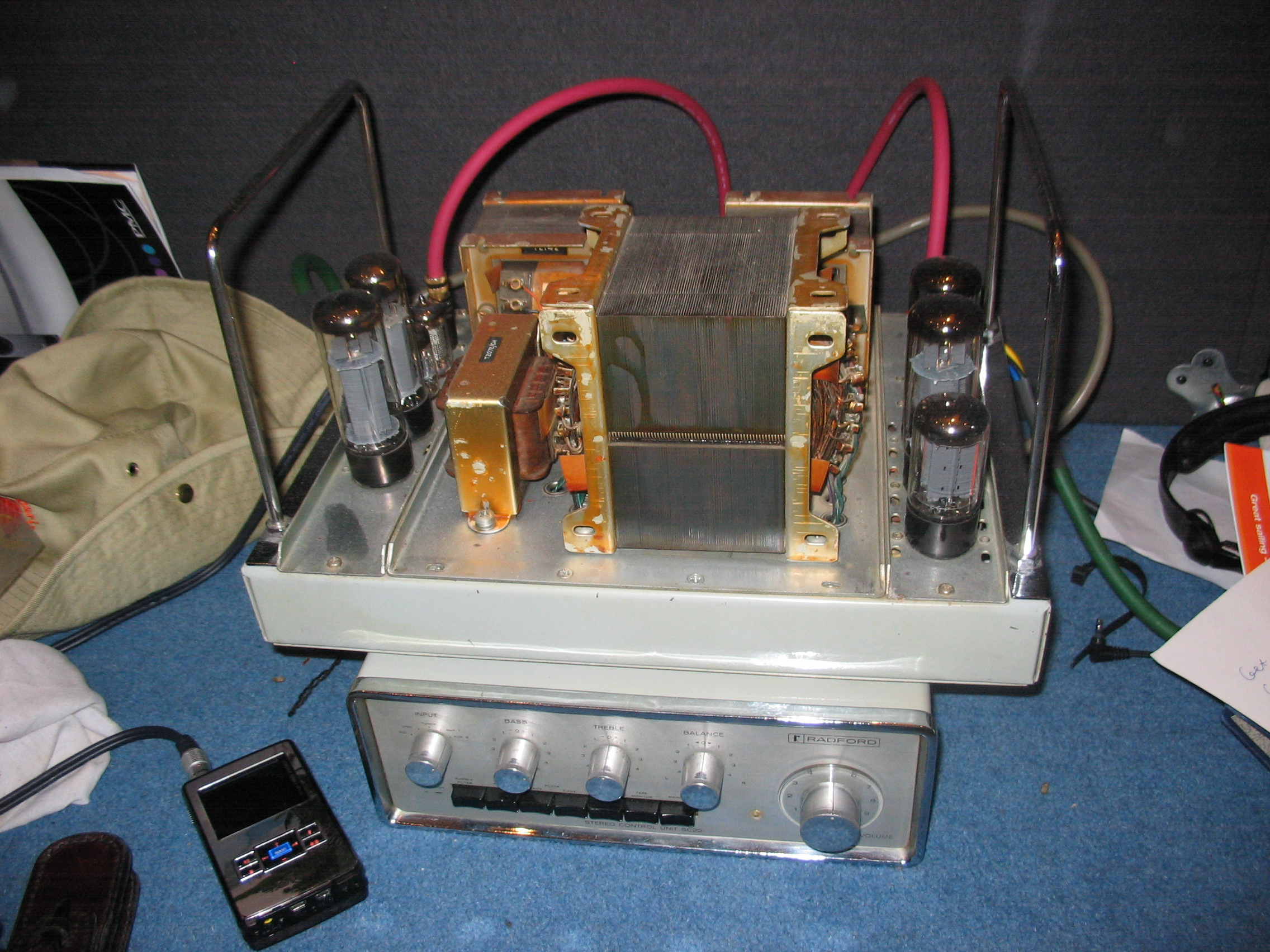
A Radford STA15 MK3 amplifier with its top cover removed

However, Arthur Radford’s greatest love was for his loudspeaker designs and the rear termination of drivers. After many years of work he eventually took out a patent in conjunction with Dr A R Bailey for the first transmission line loudspeaker. This system was the basis for all his larger designs, and is still used by many well-known manufacturers.

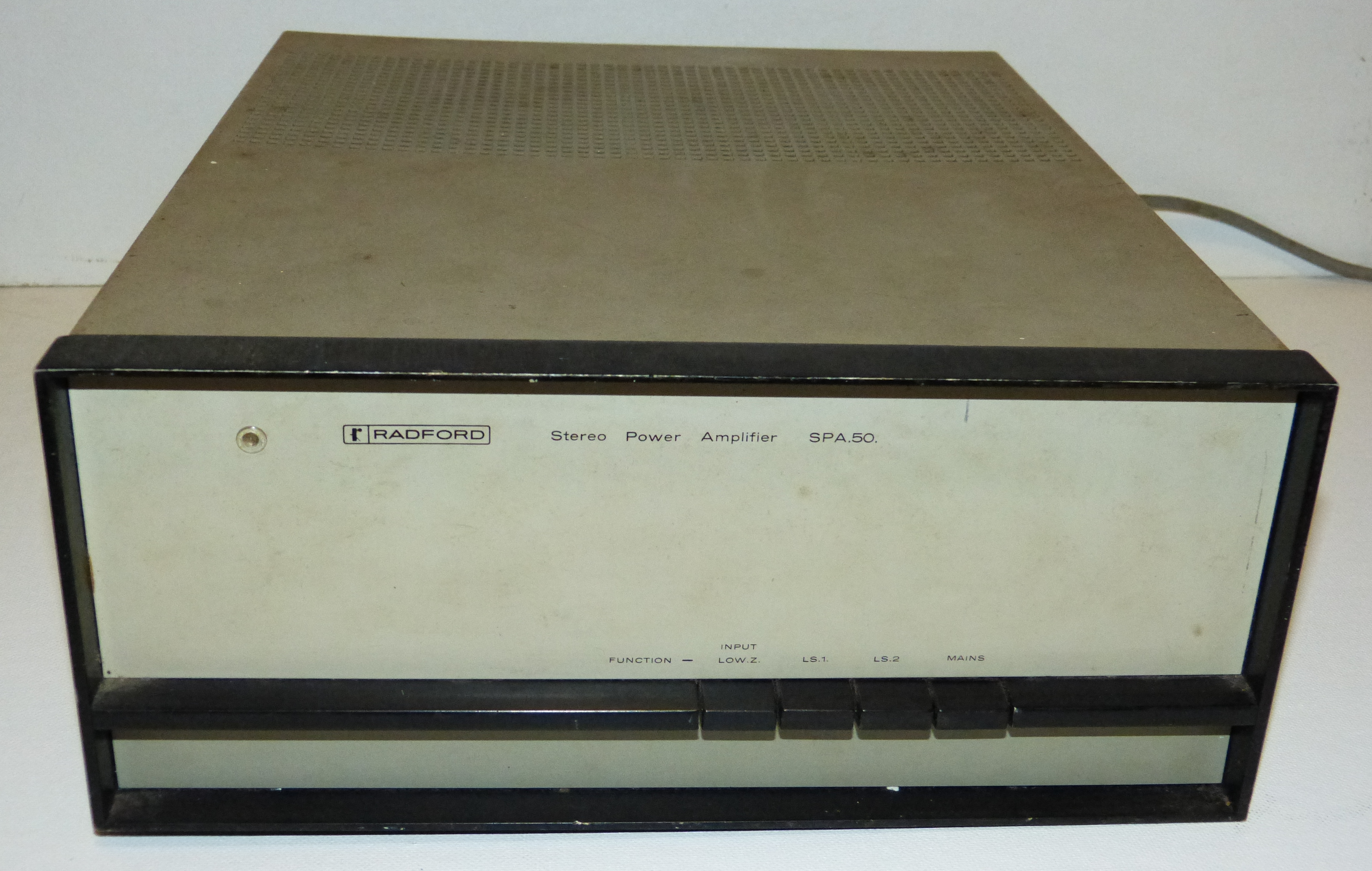
Radford SPA50 transistor power amplifier

Although today, the valve audio amplifiers attract the most attention from enthusiasts, the quality of Radford's designs continued into the transistor age with the "Zero distortion" series of solid state power amplifiers produced in the mid 1970s, in which THD was reduced to less than the circuit noise level. These, and later products such as the Quad 405 and Halcro range, achieved the near perfect measured performance for which designers had been striving since the earliest days of the industry. Left with no potential for objective improvements in quality, the industry started to concentrate on subjective analysis of designs and products which has, in some cases, led to a revival of interest in valve amplification amongst audio enthusiasts.

At its peak, Radford had four factories in Bristol, England, employing 160 personnel producing metalwork, painting, printing, transformer design / production Loudspeaker assembly / test and PCB manufacture, all in house. Another well known Radford product was the "Labpak" low voltage power supply, used in schools and colleges, both in the UK and overseas.

As Arthur approached retirement, the company was wound down as there was no one to take it on. After he retired in 1989, Woodside Electronics was formed by John Widgery, who had been apprenticed to Radford Electronics and was responsible for many of the classic designs. Mike Davis joined John as a partner in 1989, and they worked together to launch the CD player and update the range of valve equipment as part of the Renaissance series. Arthur died on 21 November 1993, and Woodside continued for a while but finally ended production in Llanbedrog, Pwllheli, North Wales in 2004.

Radford valve amplifiers are uncommon today, and still retain premium prices on the secondhand market. Much popular and frequently rebuilt, they are particularly known for classic and restrained physical design and notable, listenable sound quality - including a particular ability to drive, very smoothly, the widely demanding Quad electrostatic loudspeakers. 2006 brought expectations of a revival for the brand, with news of plans to begin manufacture of traditional valve based designs like the STA 25 Mk III in 2009.

Small scale production is now carried on by Radford Revival, a UK craft business dedicated to replicating the classic amplifiers of the company's heyday.

== See also ==
- Valve sound
