= Wayne Radford (cricketer) =

South African cricketer (born 1958)

Wayne Reginald Radford (born 29 August 1958) is a former cricketer. Born in Luanshya, Zambia, he played intermittently at first-class and List A level for Orange Free State, Boland, Eastern Transvaal and their successors Easterns, and (once) for Impalas.

He is the brother of two other significant cricketers: Neal Radford and Glen Radford.
