= Howard Radford =

Welsh footballer (1930–2022)

Personal information
- Full name: William Howard Radford
- Date of birth: 8 September 1930
- Place of birth: Abercynon, Wales
- Date of death: 21 January 2022 (aged 91)
- Place of death: TeignmouthEngland
- Height: 5 ft 9 in (1.75 m)
- Position: Goalkeeper

Senior career*
Years	Team	Apps	(Gls)
–1951	Penrhiwceiber		
1951–1962	Bristol Rovers	244	(0)
- * Club domestic league appearances and goals

William Howard Radford (8 September 1930 – 21 January 2022) was a Welsh professional footballer who played as a goalkeeper in The Football League for Bristol Rovers for eleven years between 1951 and 1962.

Radford, who was born in Abercynon, began his playing career in the nearby village of Penrhiwceiber. He was invited for a trial by Bristol Rovers in May 1951, and three months later he joined them on professional terms. He went on to make 244 League appearances for them before retiring from football in 1962, including being part of their Third Division title-winning team in the 1952–53 season.

Following his retirement he managed a number of public houses, firstly the Checkers in Old Market, then the Ring o' Bells in Coalpit Heath and the Bishop Lacey Inn in Chudleigh. Later on he worked as a steward in Chudleigh Conservative Club and as a security guard with British Aerospace.

Radford suffered a major stroke in October 2021 and was discharged from hospital in December of the same year. On 22 January 2022, Bristol Rovers reported that Radford had died the previous day, at the age of 91. At the time of his death Radford was the second oldest surviving player to have played for the club.
