= German prisoner-of-war camps in World War II =

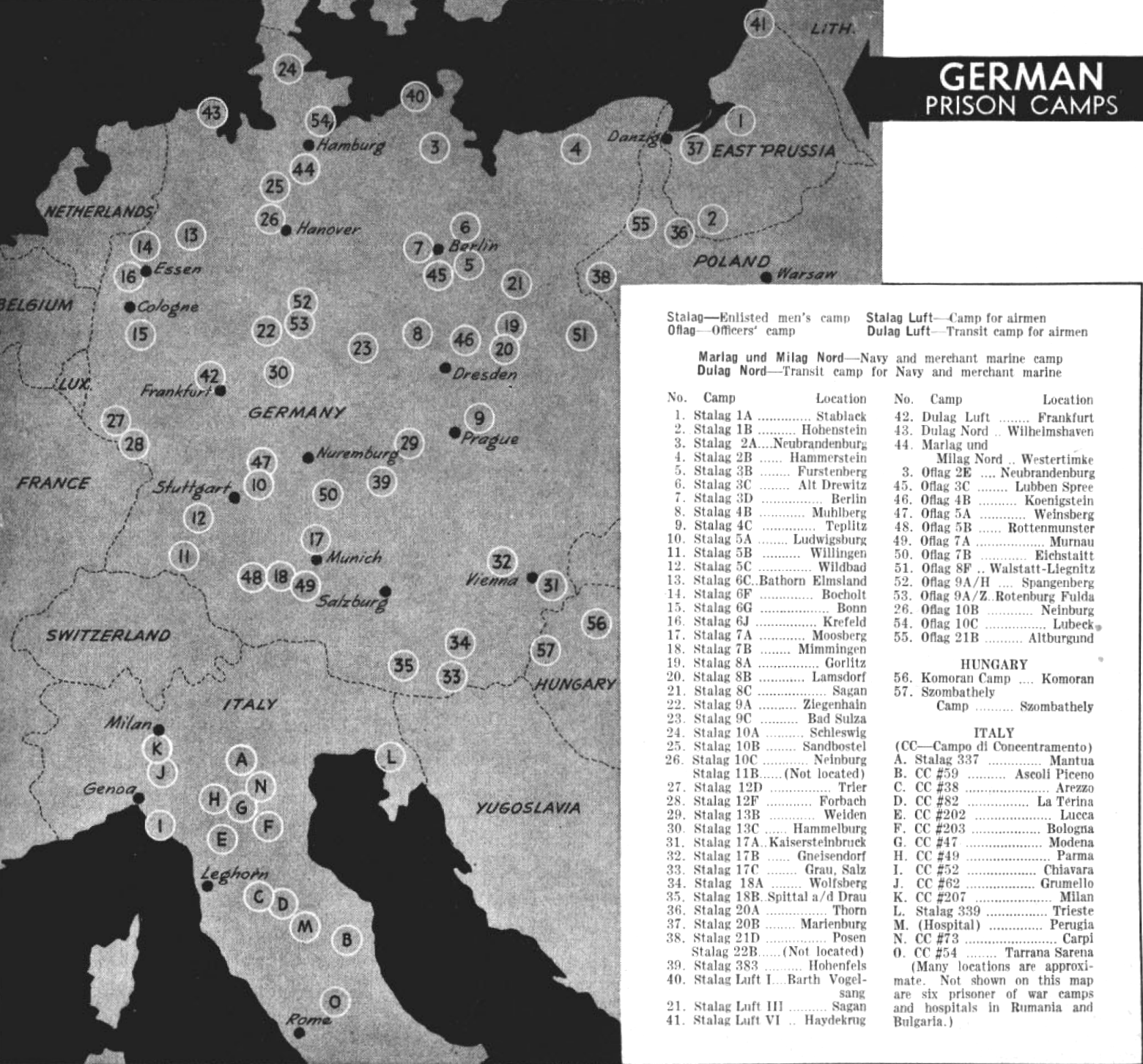
1944 map of POW camps in Germany.

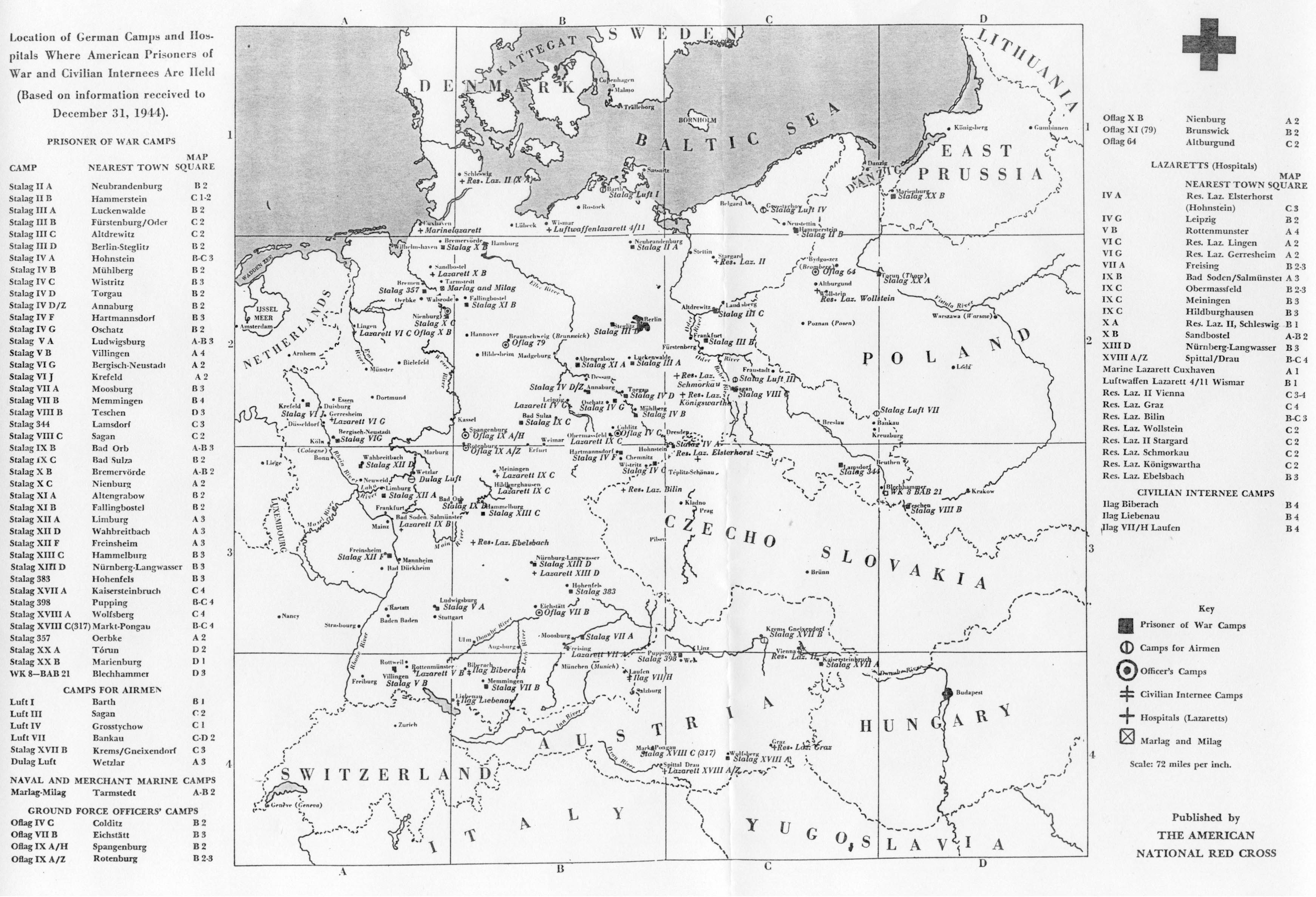
American Red Cross German POW Camp Map from December 31, 1944

Nazi Germany operated around 1,000 prisoner-of-war camps (German: Kriegsgefangenenlager) during World War II (1939-1945).

The most common types of camps were Oflags ("Officer camp") and Stalags ("Base camp" – for enlisted personnel POW camps), although other less common types existed as well.

== Legal background ==
Germany signed the Third Geneva Convention of 1929, which established norms relating to the treatment of prisoners of war.

- Article 10 required PoWs be lodged in adequately heated and lighted buildings where conditions were the same as for German troops.
- Articles 27-32 detailed the conditions of labour. Enlisted ranks were required to perform whatever labour they were asked if able to do, so long as it was not dangerous and did not support the German war-effort. Senior non-commissioned officers (sergeants and above) were required to work only in a supervisory role. Commissioned officers were not required to work, although they could volunteer. The work performed was largely agricultural or industrial, ranging from coal- or potash-mining, stone quarrying, or work in saw mills, breweries, factories, railroad yards, and forests. PoWs hired out to military and civilian contractors were supposed to receive pay. The workers were also supposed to get at least one day a week of rest.
- Article 76 ensured that PoWs who died in captivity were honourably buried in marked graves.

According to some scholars (like Christian Gerlach) Germany largely adhered to the Geneva Convention when it came to other nationalities of prisoners of war. It however disregarded it for the Soviet prisoners of war. Around 3 million of almost 6 million captured died, largely of starvation and disease, but also executions.

== Conditions ==
In the early phases of the war, following German occupation of much of Europe, Germany also found itself unprepared for the number of POWs it held, and released many (particularly enlisted personnel) on parole (as a result, it released all the Dutch, all Flemish Belgian, nine-tenths of the Poles, and nearly a third of the French captives). As the war went on, Germany however refused to release other POWs, seeing them as blackmail material against others (ex. Vichy France). Conditions of soldiers from countries which no longer posed a significant threat to Germany (ex. Poland) were generally worse than those of others; British and American POWs received generally the best treatment.

Conditions in the camp have been described as bad, but (for POWs of Western Allies) improved as the war went on and Germans had to consider that they held significant amount of German POWs and could enact retribution.

== Types of camp ==
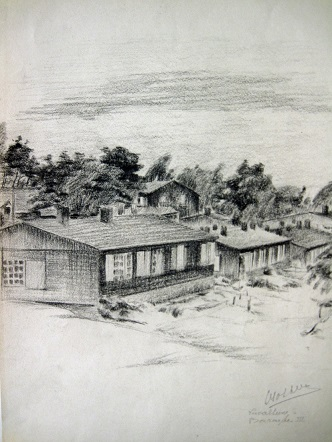
Administration Barrack III in Oflag XD, drawn by Belgian officer POW Léon Gossens, 1944

- Dulag or Durchgangslager (transit camp) – These camps served as a collection point for POWs prior to reassignment. These camps were intelligence collection centers.
- Dulag Luft or Durchgangslager der Luftwaffe (transit camp of the Luftwaffe) – These were transit camps for Air Force/Air Corps POWs. The main Dulag Luft camp at Frankfurt was the principal collecting point for intelligence derived from Allied POW interrogation
- Heilag or Heimkehrerlager (repatriation camps) - Camps for the return of prisoners. Quite often these men had suffered disabling injuries.
- Ilag/Jlag or Internierungslager ("Internment camp") – These were civilian internment camps.
- Marlag or Marine-Lager ("Marine camp") – These were Navy/Marine personnel POW camps.
- Milag or Marine-Internierten-Lager ("Marine internment camp") – These were merchant seamen internment camps.
- Oflag or Offizier-Lager ("Officer camp") – These were POW camps for officers.
- Stalag or Stammlager ("Base camp") – These were enlisted personnel POW camps.
- Stalag Luft or Luftwaffe-Stammlager ("Luftwaffe base camp") – These were POW camps administered by the German Air Force for Allied aircrews (including officers, e.g. Stalag Luft I).

== Nomenclature ==
At the start of World War II, the German Army was divided into 17 military districts (Wehrkreise), which were each assigned Roman numerals. The camps were numbered according to the military district. A letter behind the Roman number marked individual Stalags in a military district.

e.g.

Stalag II-D was the fourth Stalag in Military District II (Wehrkreis II).

Sub-camps had a suffix "/Z" (for Zweiglager - sub-camp). The main camp had a suffix of "/H" (for Hauptlager - main camp).

e.g.

Oflag VII-C/H meant this is the main camp.
Oflag VII-C/Z meant this is a sub-camp of a main camp.

Some of these sub-camps were not the traditional POW camps with barbed wire fences and guard towers, but merely accommodation centers.

== List of camps by military district ==
=== Military District I (Königsberg) ===
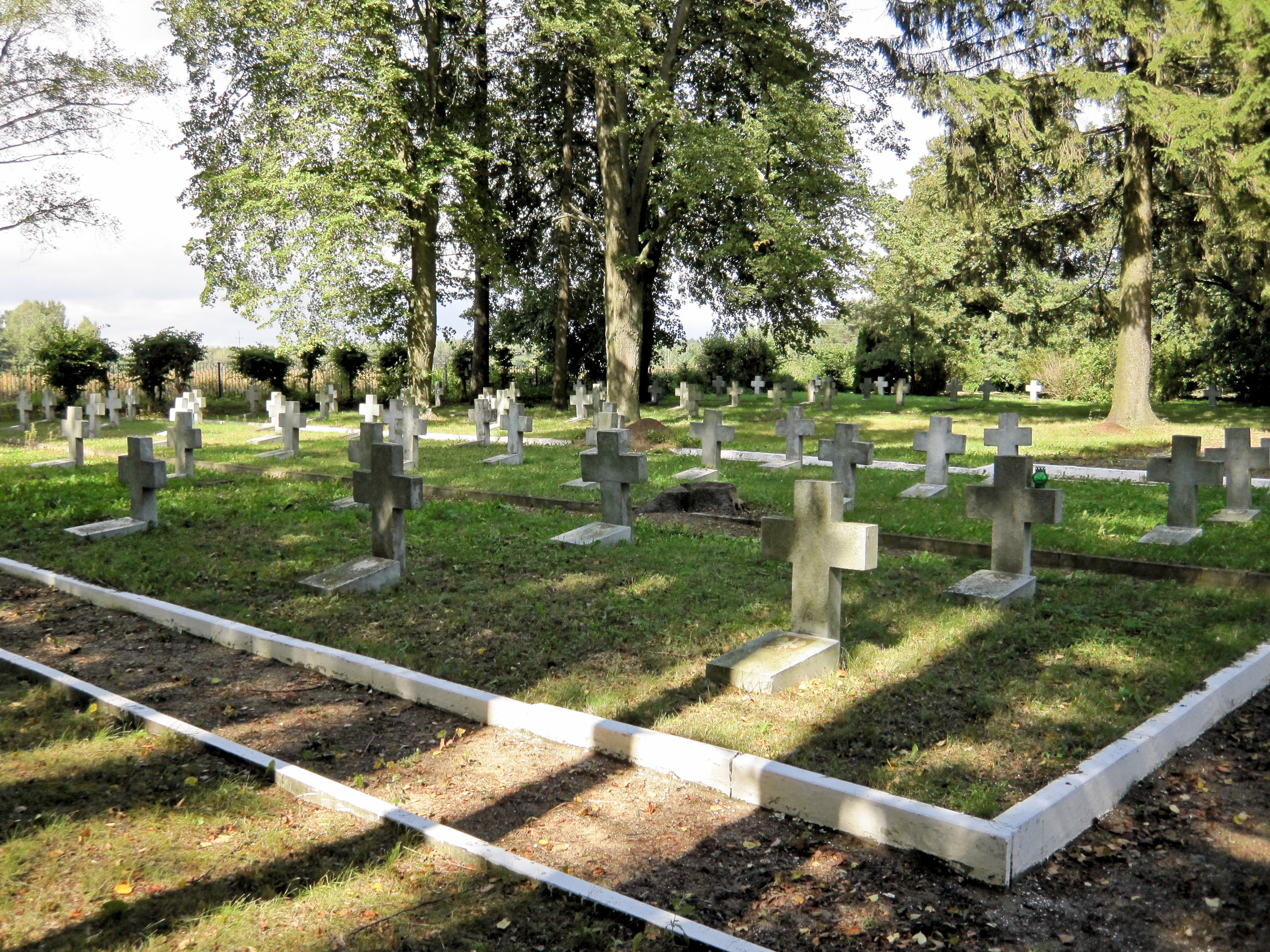
Cemetery of the victims of the Stalag I-B camp in Sudwa

- Stalag I-A in Stablack (Kamińsk and Dolgorukovo)
- Stalag I-B in Hohenstein (Olsztynek)
- Stalag I-C/331, from June 1943: Stalag Luft VI, in Heydekrug (Šilutė)
- Stalag I-D in Ebenrode (Nesterov) and Heydekrug (Šilutė)
- Stalag I-E in Prostken (Prostki) and Sudauen (Suwałki)
- Stalag I-F in Sudauen (Suwałki)
- Oflag 52 in Ebenrode (Nesterov)
- Oflag 53 in Pagėgiai
- Oflag 56 in Prostken (Prostki)
- Oflag 60 in Schirwindt (Kutuzovo)
- Oflag 63 in Dłutowo
- Oflag 68 in Krzywólka

=== Military District II (Stettin) ===
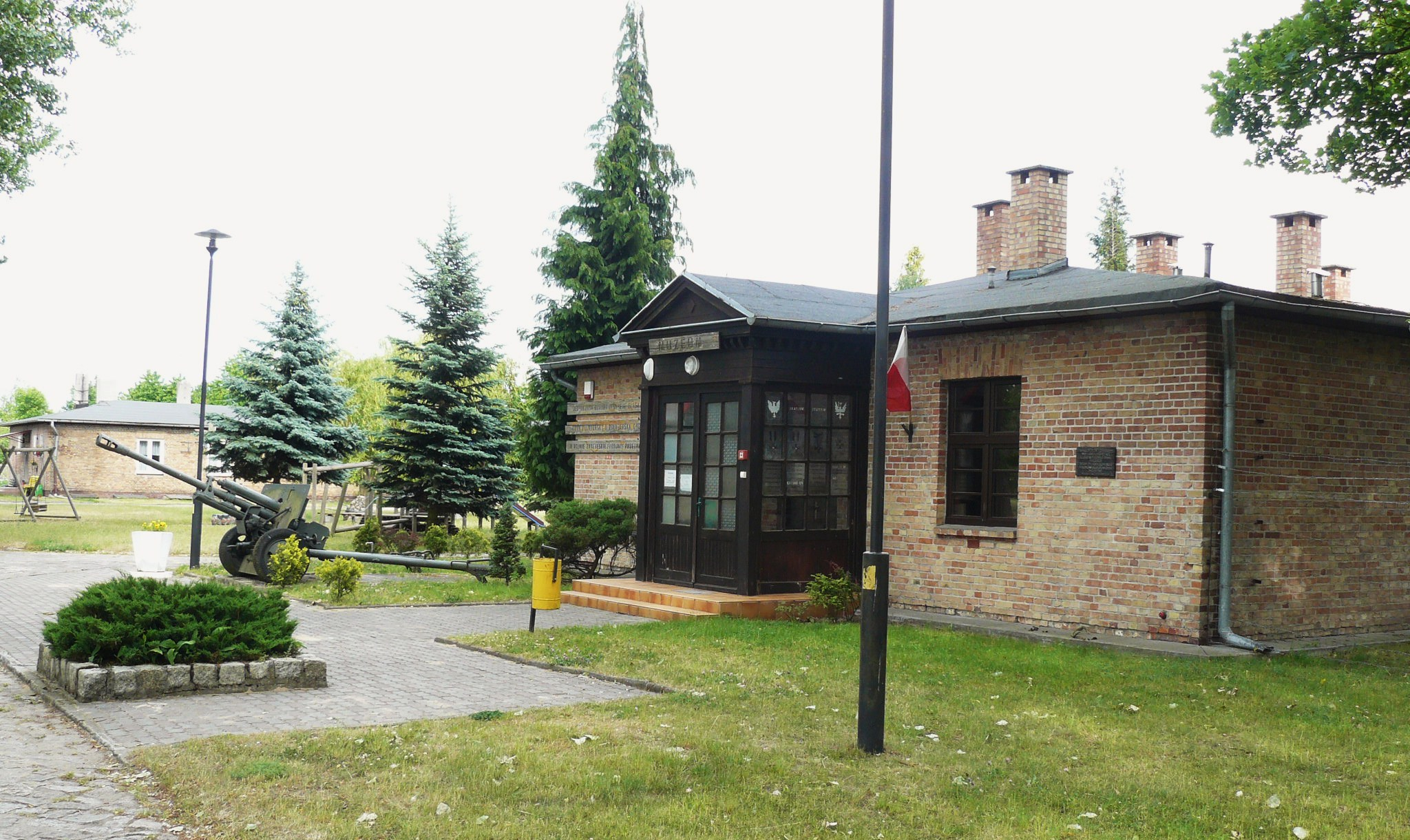
Former Oflag II-C camp in Dobiegniew, now a museum

- Stalag II-A in Neubrandenburg
- Stalag II-B in Hammerstein (Czarne)
- Stalag II-C in Greifswald
- Stalag II-D in Stargard
- Stalag II-E in Schwerin
- Stalag II-F in Czarne
- Stalag II-G/323 in Borne Sulinowo
- Stalag II-H/302 in Barkniewko and Raderitz (Nadarzyce)
- Oflag II-A in Prenzlau
- Oflag II-B in Arnswalde (Choszczno)
- Oflag II-C in Woldenberg (Dobiegniew)
- Oflag II-D in Gross Born (Borne Sulinowo)
- Oflag II-E in Neubrandenburg
- Oflag 67 in Neubrandenburg
- Oflag 80 in Prenzlau

=== Military District III (Berlin) ===
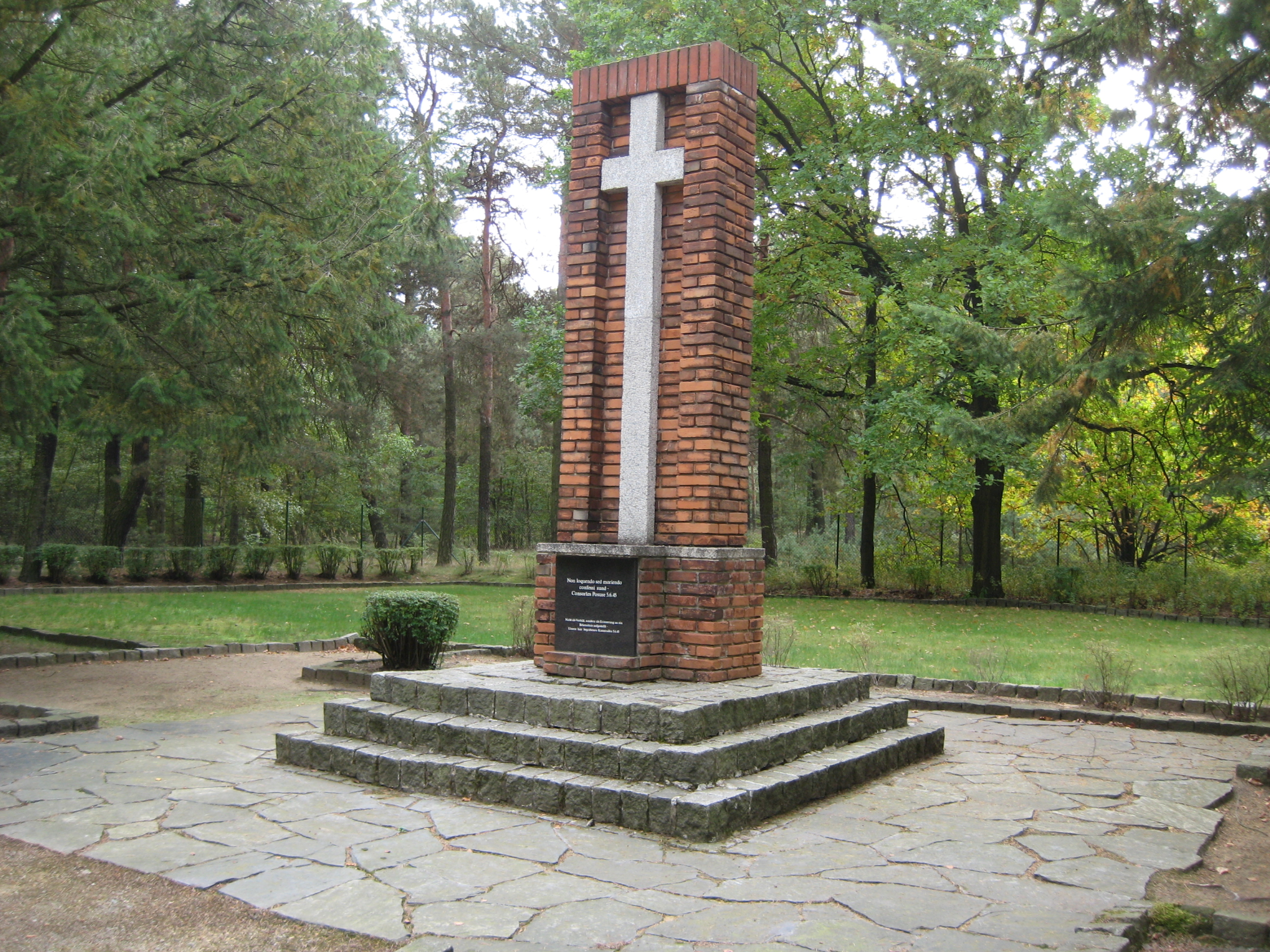
Memorial to the victims of Stalag III-A in Luckenwalde

- Stalag III-A Luckenwalde
- Stalag III-B Fürstenberg/Oder
- Stalag III-C Alt-Drewitz (Drzewice)
- Stalag III-D Berlin-Lichterfelde
- Oflag III-A Luckenwalde
- Oflag III-B Wehrmachtlager Tibor/Zuellichau (Cibórz/Sulechów)
- Oflag III-C Lübben/Spree
- Oflag 8 in Frauenberg and Wutzetz (Germany)

=== Military District IV (Dresden) ===
- Stalag IV-A Elsterhorst
- Stalag IV-B Mühlberg (Elbe)
- Stalag IV-C Wistritz (Bystřice)
- Stalag IV-D Torgau
- Stalag IV-E Altenburg
- Stalag IV-F Hartmannsdorf
- Stalag IV-G Oschatz
- Stalag IV-H Zeithain
- Oflag IV-A Hohnstein
- Oflag IV-B Koenigstein
- Oflag IV-C Colditz Castle
- Oflag IV-D Elsterhorst
- Oflag IV-E/54 Annaburg

=== Military District V (Stuttgart) ===
- Stalag V-A Ludwigsburg
- Stalag V-B Villingen
- Stalag V-C Wildberg
- Stalag V-D Strasbourg
- Oflag V-A Weinsberg
- Oflag V-B Biberach
- Oflag V-C Wurzach
- Oflag V-D/55 Offenburg

=== Military District VI (Münster) ===
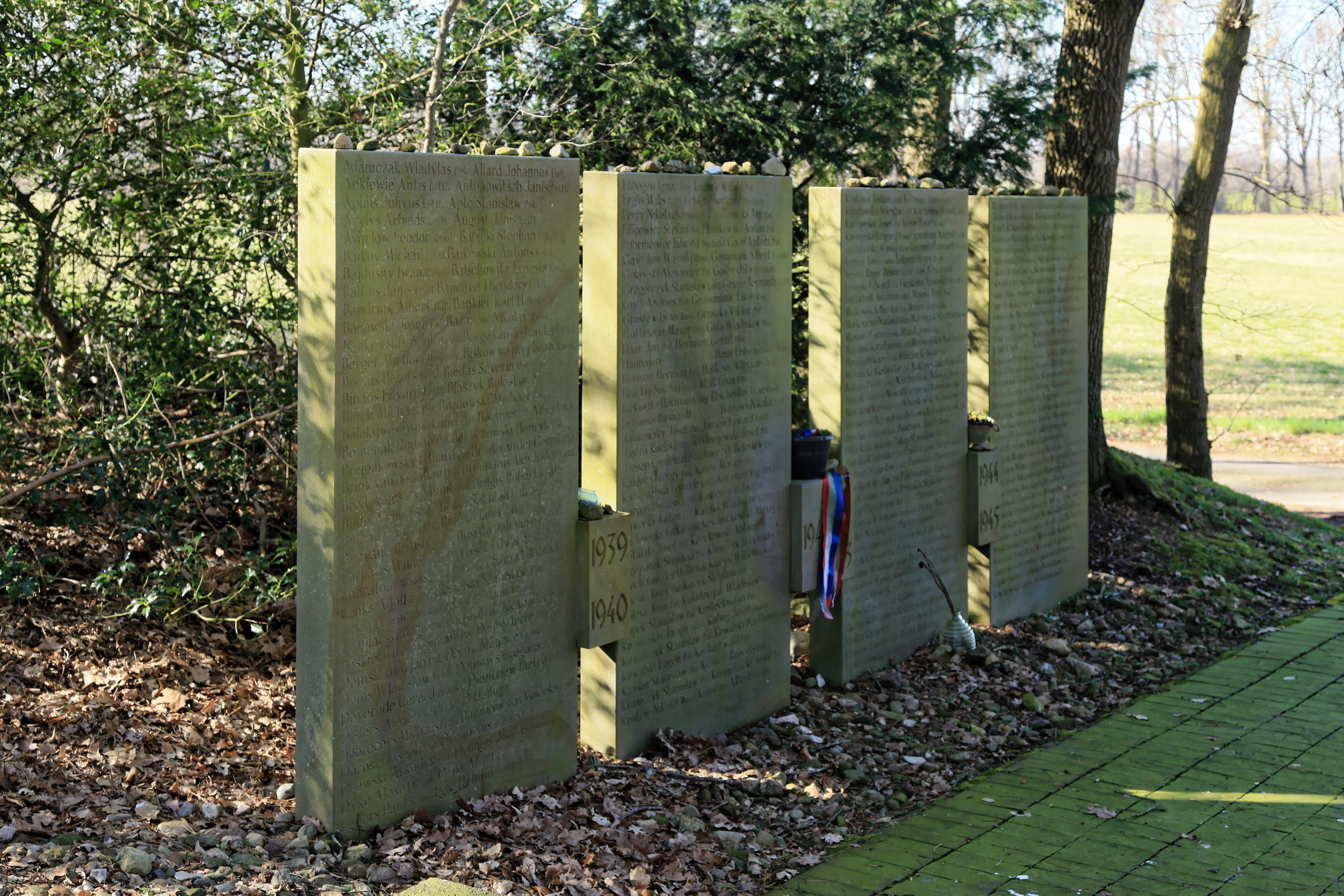
Cemetery of the victims of the Stalag VI-B camp in Meppen

- Stalag VI-A Hemer/Iserlohn
- Stalag VI-B Neu-Versen
- Stalag VI-C Oberlangen/Emsland
- Stalag VI-D Dortmund
- Stalag VI-E Soest
- Stalag VI-F Bocholt
- Stalag VI-G Bonn–Duisdorf 1944-45 Hoffnungsthal
- Stalag VI-H Arnoldsweiler/Dueren
- Stalag VI-J S.A. Lager Fichtenhein/Krefeld and Dorsten
- Stalag VI-K Stukenbrock
- Stalag 308 Bathorn
- Oflag VI-A Soest
- Oflag VI-B Doessel–Warburg
- Oflag VI-C Eversheide/Osnabrück
- Oflag VI-D Münster
- Oflag VI-E Dorsten

=== Military District VII (Munich) ===
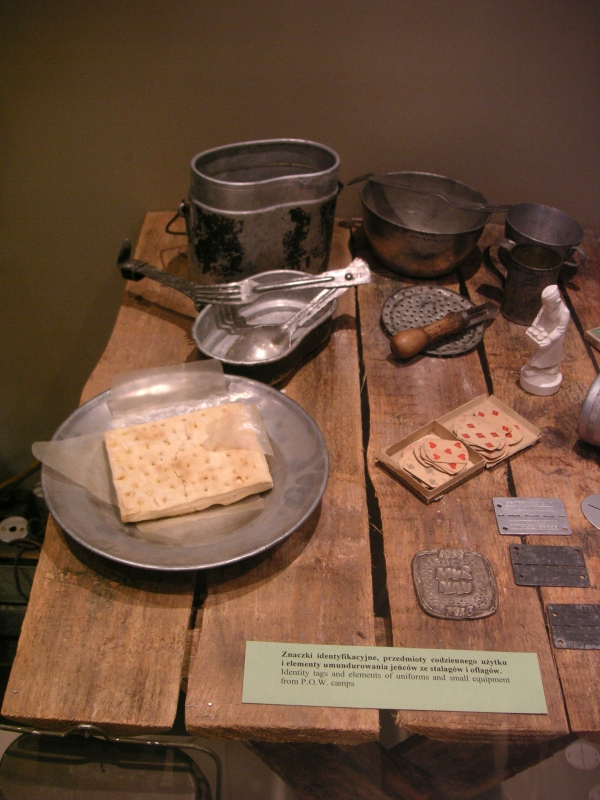
Collection of everyday items of Polish prisoners from the Oflag VII-A Murnau.

- Stalag VII-A Moosburg
- Stalag VII-B Memmingen
- Oflag VII Laufen
- Oflag VII-A Murnau am Staffelsee
- Oflag VII-B Eichstaett
- Oflag VII-C Laufen
- Oflag VII-D Tittmoning
- Oflag 78/VII-E in Großgmain and Hohenfels

=== Military District VIII (Breslau) ===
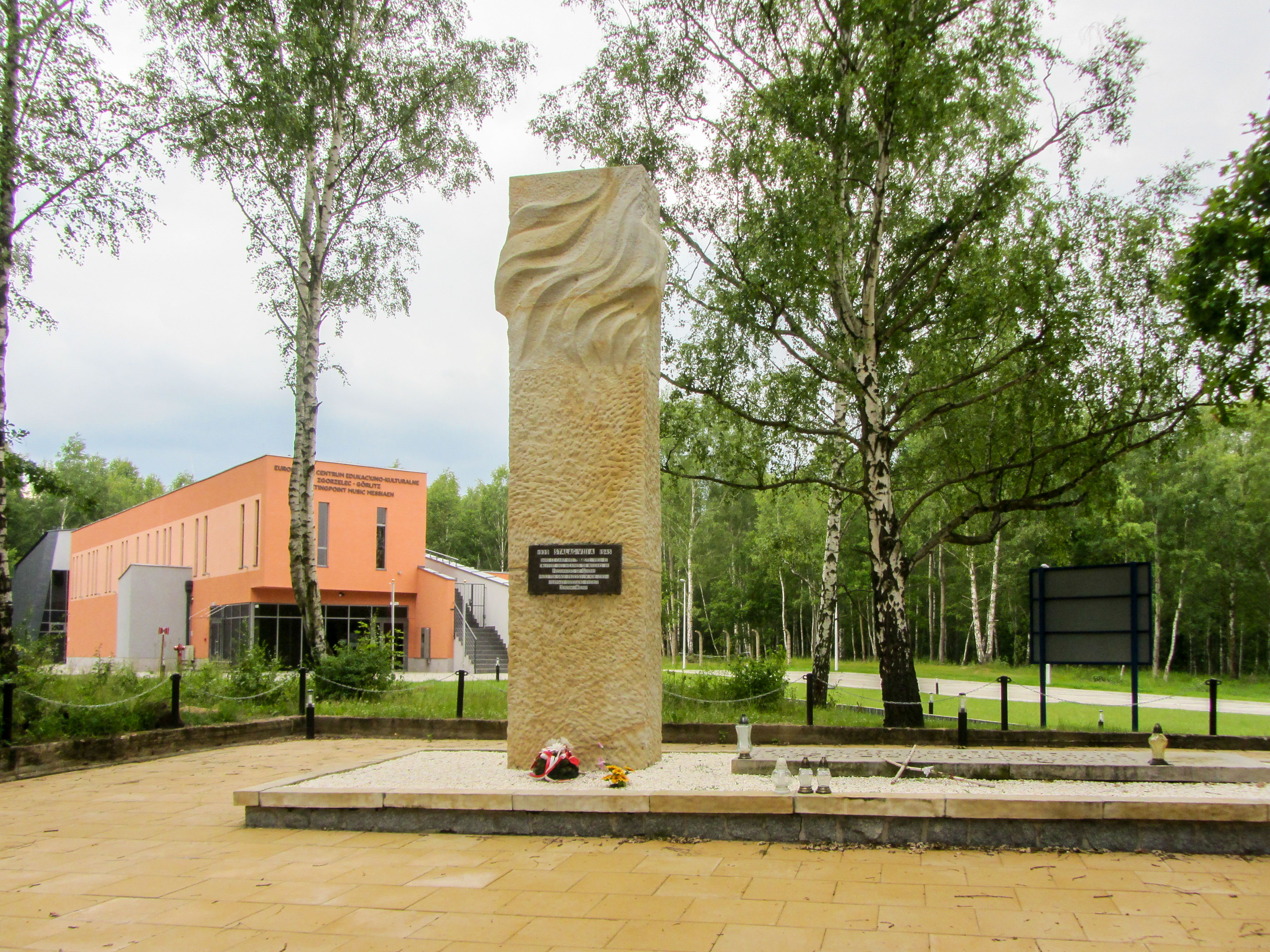
Memorial to the victims of the Stalag VIII-A camp in Zgorzelec

- Stalag VIII-A Görlitz (Zgorzelec)
- Stalag VIII-B Lamsdorf (Łambinowice)
- Stalag VIII-C Sagan (Żagań)
- Stalag VIII-D Teschen (Český Těšín)
- Stalag VIII-E/308 Neuhammer (Świętoszów)
- Stalag VIII-F Lamsdorf (Łambinowice)
- Oflag VIII-A Kreuzburg/Oppeln (Kluczbork/Opole)
- Oflag VIII-B Silberberg (Srebrna Góra)
- Oflag VIII-C Juliusburg (Dobroszyce)
- Oflag VIII-D/Tittmoning Castle
- Oflag VIII-E Johannisbrunn (Jánské Koupele)
- Oflag VIII-F in Wahlstatt (Legnickie Pole) and Mährisch-Trübau (Moravská Třebová)
- Oflag VIII-G in Weidenau (Vidnava) and Freiwaldau (Jeseník)
- Oflag VIII-H/H Oberlangendorf/Sternberg
- Oflag VIII-H/Z Eulenberg/Roemerstadt (Rýmařov)
- Oflag 6 in Tost (Toszek)

=== Military District IX (Kassel) ===
- Stalag IX-A Ziegenhain
- Stalag IX-B Wegscheide/Bad Orb
- Stalag IX-C Bad Sulza
- Oflag IX-A/H Burg Spangenberg
- Oflag IX-A/Z Rotenburg/Fulda
- Oflag IX-B Weilburg/Lahn
- Oflag IX-C Molsdorf near Erfurt

=== Military District X (Hamburg) ===
- Stalag X-A Schleswig
- Stalag X-B Sandbostel
- Stalag X-C Nienburg/Weser
- Stalag X-D Wietzendorf
- Oflag X Hohensalza
- Oflag X-A Itzehoe
- Oflag X-B Nienburg/Weser
- Oflag X-C Lübeck
- Oflag X-D Fischbek
- Oflag 83 Wietzendorf

=== Military District XI (Hanover) ===
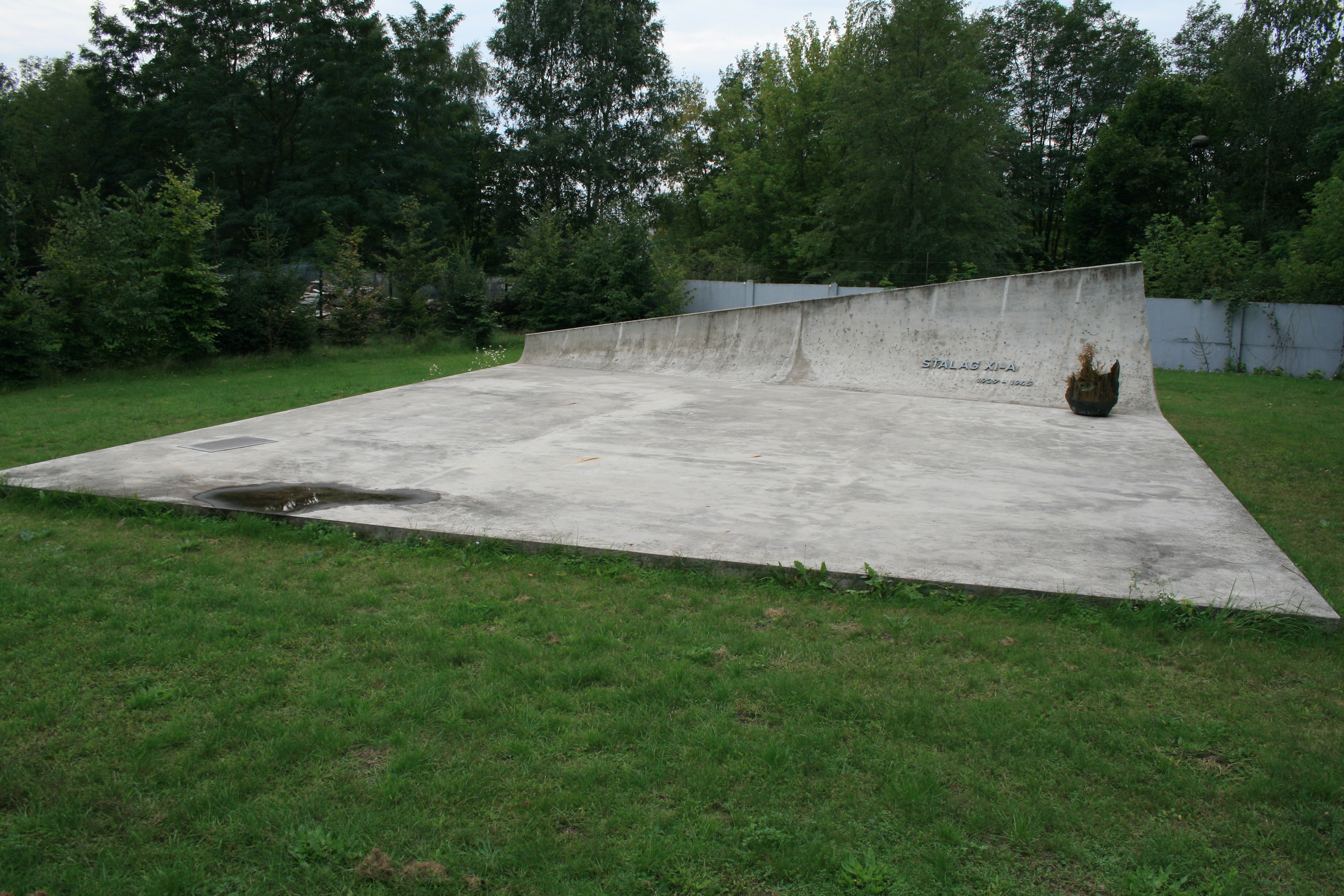
Memorial to the prisoners of Stalag XI-A

- Stalag XI-A Altengrabow
- Stalag XI-B Fallingbostel
- Stalag XI-C Bergen-Belsen
- Stalag XI-D Oerbke
- Oflag XI-A Osterode am Harz

=== Military District XII (Wiesbaden) ===
- Stalag XII-A Limburg an der Lahn
- Stalag XII-B Frankenthal/Palatinate
- Stalag XII-C Wiebelsheim/Rhein
- Stalag XII-D Trier/Petrisberg (Trèves)
- Stalag XII-E in Metz (France) and Zambrów (Poland)
- Stalag XII-F in Sarrebourg, Boulay-Moselle and Forbach (France), Dudweiler and Freinsheim (Germany)
- Oflag XII-A Hadamar/Limburg an der Lahn
- Oflag XII-B Mainz

=== Military District XIII (Nuremberg) ===
- Stalag XIII-A Sulzbach-Rosenberg
- Stalag XIII-B Weiden/Oberpfalz
- Stalag XIII-C Hammelburg
- Stalag XIII-D Nuremberg-Langwasser
- Oflag XIII-A Nuremberg-Langwasser
- Oflag XIII-B Hammelburg
- Oflag XIII-D Nuremberg-Langwasser

=== Military District XVII (Vienna) ===
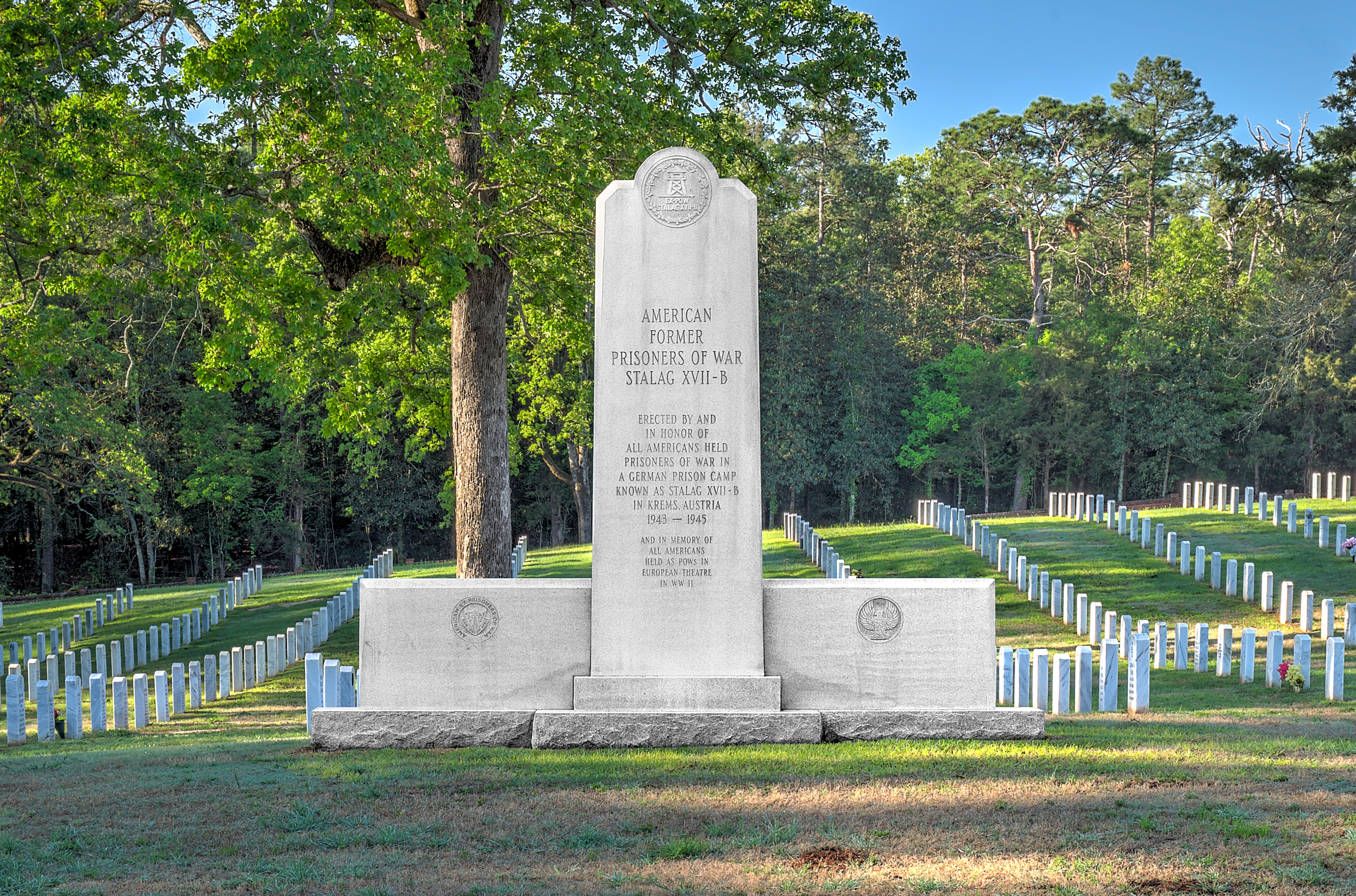
Stalag XVII-B Monument at Andersonville Prison

- Stalag XVII-A Kaisersteinbruch
- Stalag XVII-B Krems–Gneixendorf. Formerly named Dulag Gneixendorf
- Stalag XVII-C Döllersheim. Previously named Dulag Döllersheim
- Stalag XVII-D Pupping. Previously named Zweiglager Pupping, renamed Stalag 237, Stalag 397, and finally Stalag 398 Pupping
- Oflag XVII-A Edelbach

=== Military District XVIII (Salzburg) ===
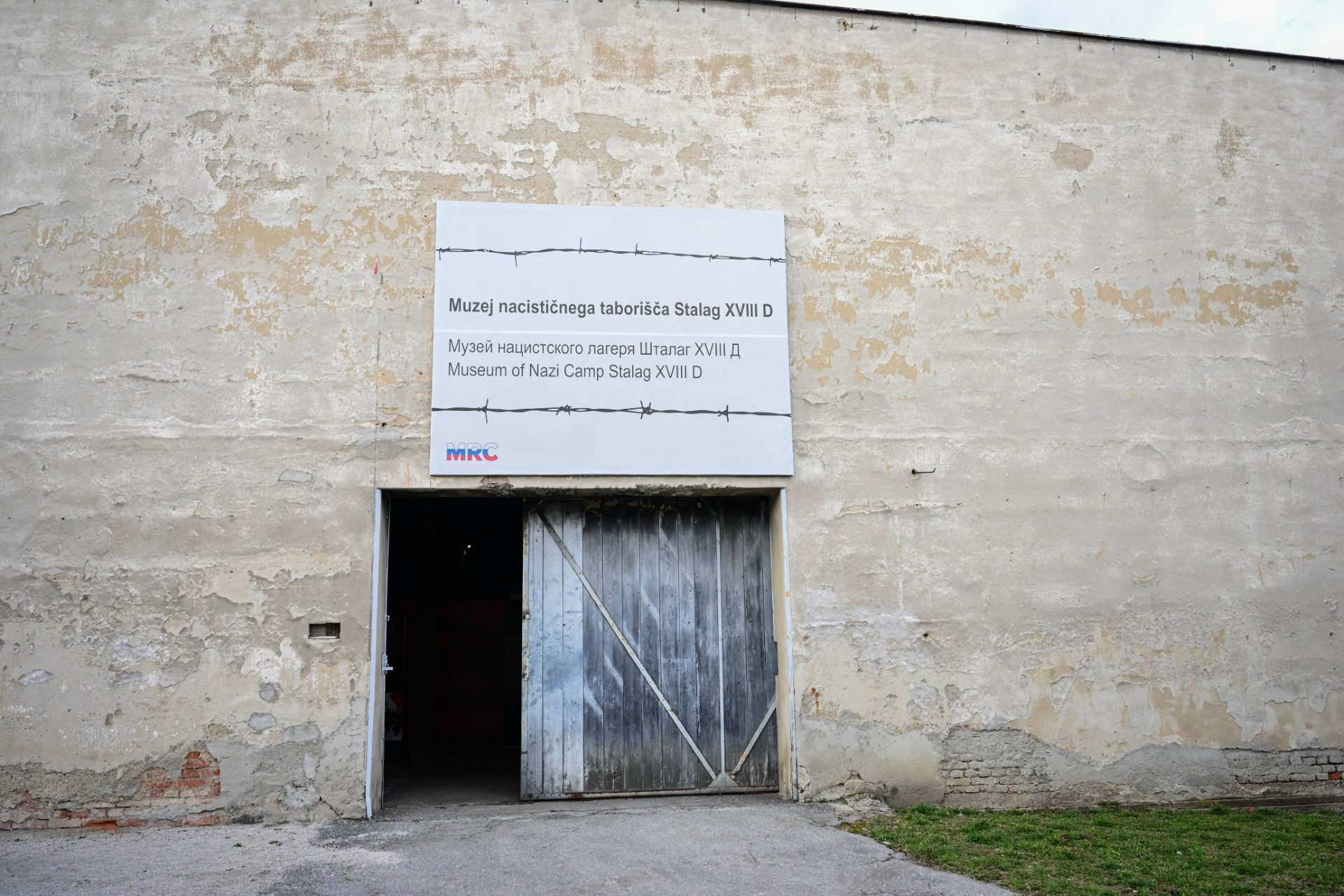
Former Stalag XVIII-D camp in Maribor, now a museum

- Stalag XVIII-A Wolfsberg
- Stalag XVIII-A/Z Spittal
- Stalag XVIII-B Oberdrauburg
- Stalag XVIII-C Markt Pongau
- Stalag XVIII-D Maribor (Slovenia)
- Oflag XVIII-A Lienz/Drau
- Oflag XVIII-B Wolfsberg/Kaernten
- Oflag XVIII-C Spittal/Drau

=== Military District XX (Danzig) ===
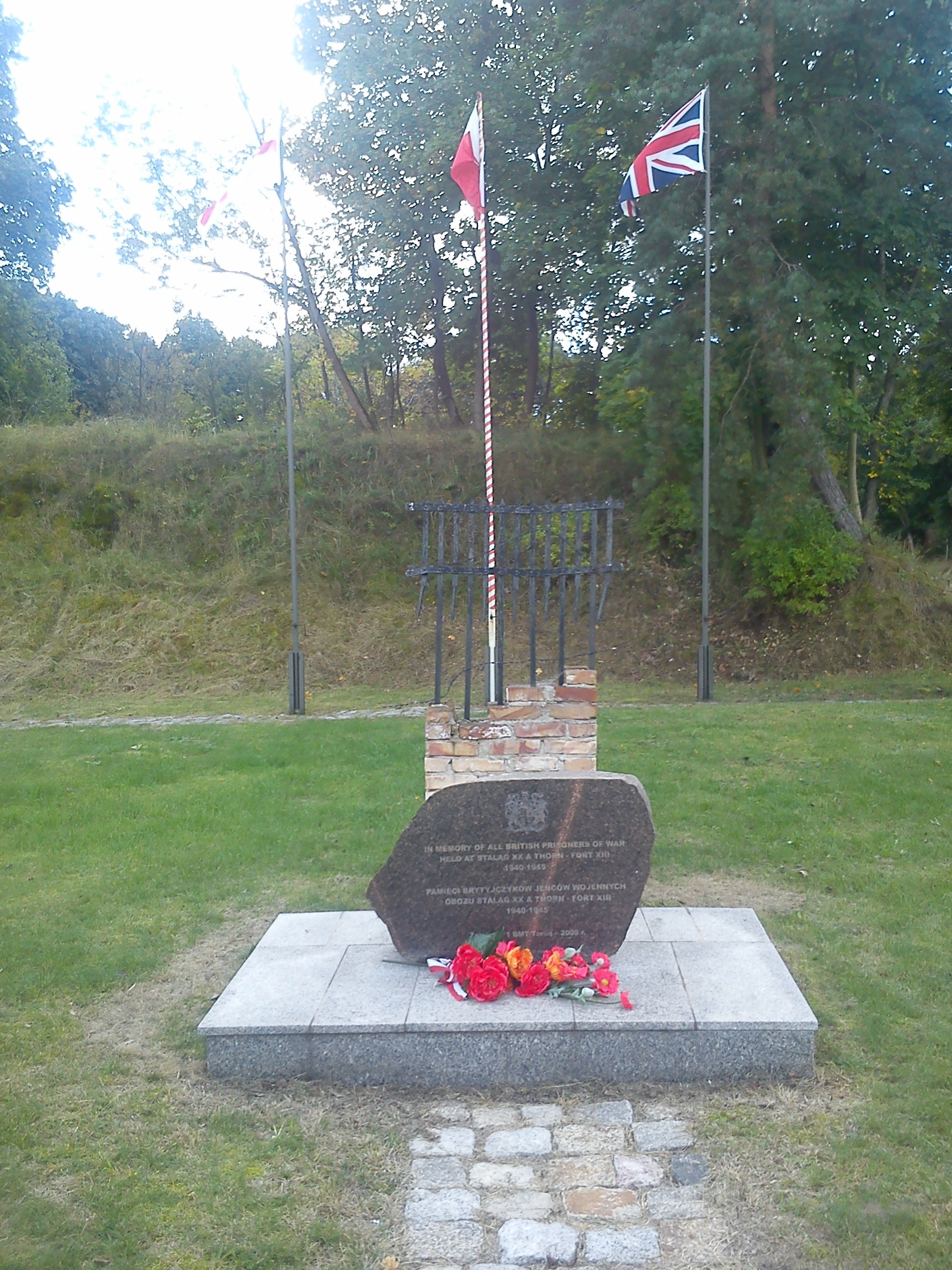
Memorial to British POWs of Stalag XX-A in Toruń

- Stalag XX-A in Toruń (Poland)
- Stalag XX-B in Licze and Wielbark (Poland)

=== Military District XXI (Posen) ===
- Stalag XXI-A in Schildberg (Ostrzeszów, Poland)
- Stalag XXI-B in Schubin (Szubin, Poland)
- Stalag XXI-B in Tur (Poland)
- Stalag XXI-C in Wollstein (Wolsztyn, Poland)
- Stalag XXI-D in Posen (Poznań, Poland)
- Stalag XXI-E in Graetz (Grodzisk Wielkopolski, Poland)
- Oflag XXI-A in Schokken (Skoki, Poland)
- Oflag XXI-B in Schubin (Szubin)

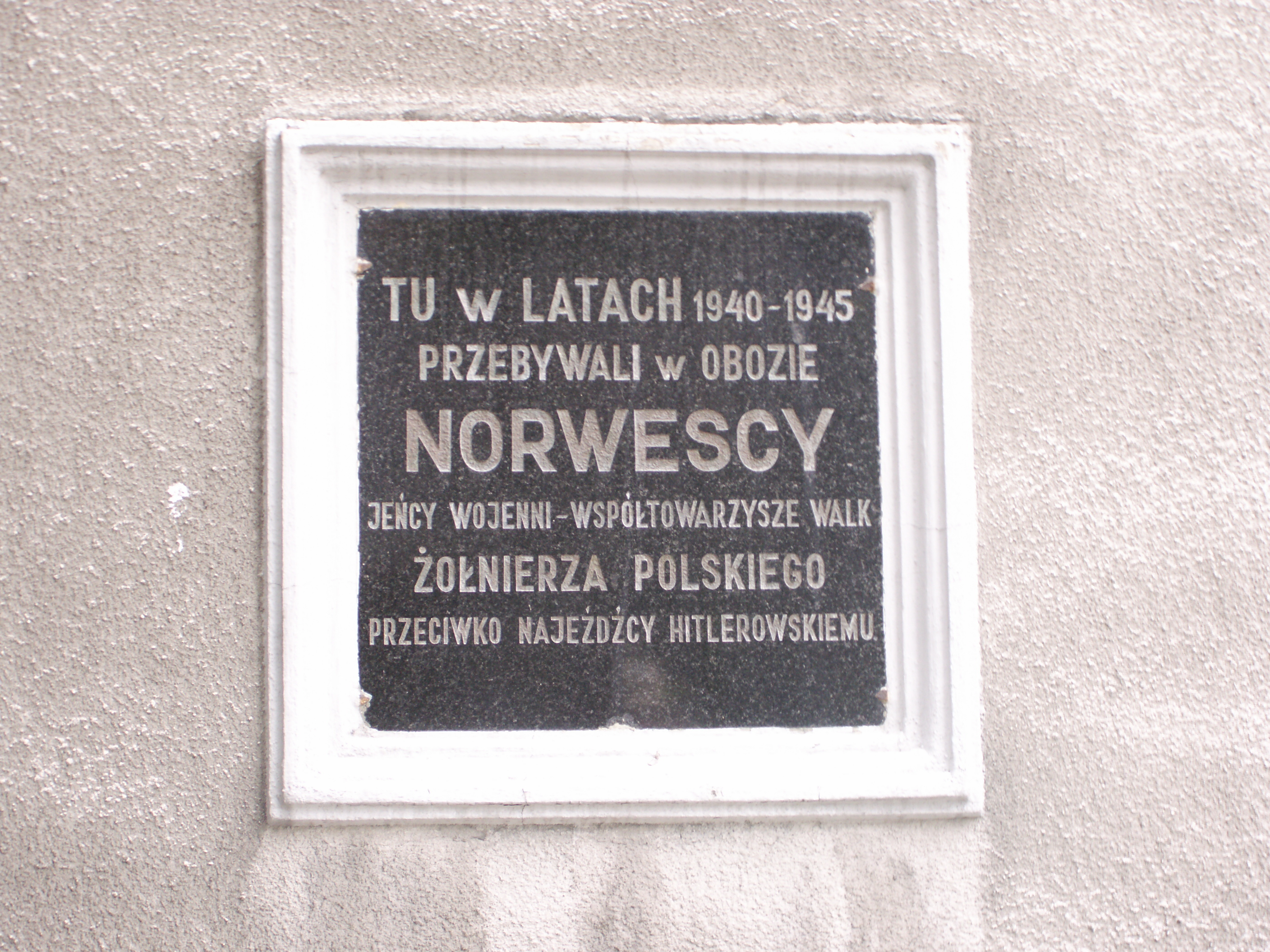
Memorial to Norwegian POWs of Oflag XXI-C in Ostrzeszów

- Oflag XXI-C in Schokken (Skoki) and Schildberg (Ostrzeszów, Poland)
  - Oflag XXI-C/Z in Grune (Gronówko, Poland)
- Oflag 10 in Mątwy (Poland)

=== Other camps ===
- Oflag 57 in Murnau am Staffelsee (Germany), Ostrołęka and Białystok (Poland)
- Oflag 58 in Nowa Kuźnia and Siedlce (Poland)
- Oflag 64 in Legnickie Pole and Szubin (Poland)
- Oflag 65 in Lubny (Ukraine), Strasbourg (France) and Barkniewko (Poland)
- Oflag 66 in Osnabrück-Eversheide (Germany)
- Oflag 73 in Beniaminów (Poland) and Nuremberg-Langwasser (Germany)
- Oflag 76 in Lwów (Poland)
- Oflag 77 in Dęblin (Poland)
- Oflag 79 in Waggum, Braunschweig
- Stalag 122 in Compiègne (France)
- Stalag 133 in Rennes (France)
- Stalag 160 in Lunéville (France)
- Stalag 191 in La Fère (France)
- Stalag 237 in Piotrków Trybunalski (Poland)
- Stalag 301 in Sieradz, Lublin and Kowel (Poland), Slavuta and Shepetivka (Ukraine)
- Stalag 303 in Jørstadmoen (Norway)
- Stalag 304/IV-H in Zeithain (Germany), Leuven (Belgium) and Trieste (Italy)
- Stalag 305 in Rzeszów (Poland) and Kirovohrad (Ukraine)
- Stalag 307 in Kaliłów and Dęblin (Poland)
- Stalag 308 in Sumy (Ukraine)
- Stalag 309 in Salla (Finland) and Lakselv (Norway)
- Stalag 310 in Konotop, Zaporizhzhia, Nikopol, Dnipropetrovsk, Novoukrainka, Pomichna, Pervomaisk and Balta (Ukraine), and Przemyśl (Poland)
- Stalag 312/XX-C in Toruń (Poland), Khanzhenkovo and Zaporizhzhia (Ukraine)
- Stalag 313 in Vitebsk (Belarus)
- Stalag 315 in Przemyśl (Poland), Villingen (Germany) and Épinal (France)
- Stalag 316 in Siedlce, Wołkowysk and Białystok (Poland)

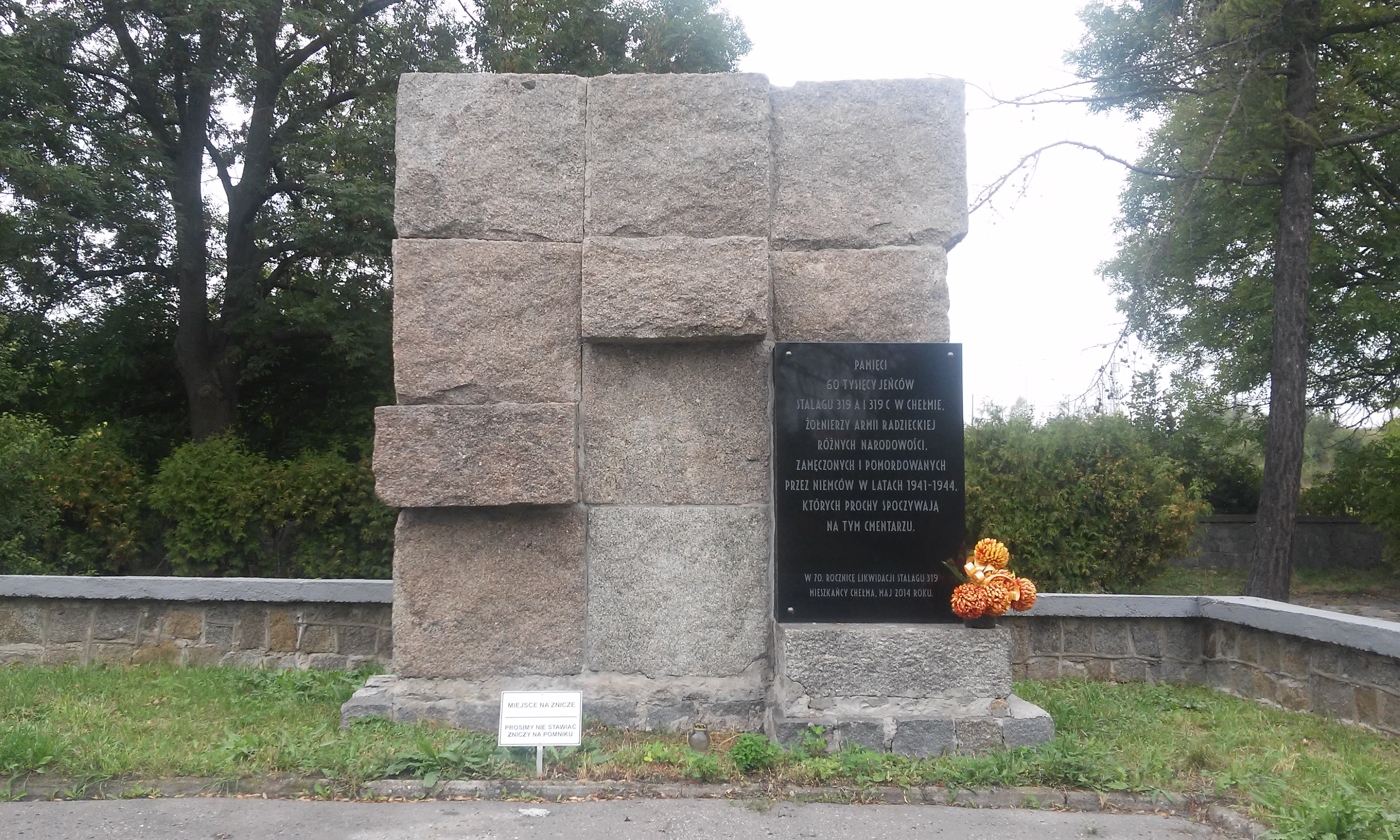
Memorial to the victims of the Stalag 319 camp in Chełm

- Stalag 319 in Chełm (Poland)
- Stalag 322 in Szczecin (Poland) and Kaskinen and Rovaniemi (Finland)
- Stalag 323 in Chyrów and Tarnopol (Poland)
- Stalag 324 in Grądy and Łosośna (Poland)
- Stalag 325 in Zamość, Rawa Ruska, Lwów, Stryj and Szebnie (Poland)
- Stalag 327 in Jarosław, Sanok and Przemyśl (Poland)
- Stalag 328 in Lemberg and Drohobycz (Poland)
- Stalag 329 in Zeithain (Germany), Zhmerynka and Vinnytsia (Ukraine)
- Stalag 330 in Hammelburg (Germany), Alta and Beisfjord (Norway)
- Stalag 332 in Viljandi (Estonia)
- Stalag 333 in Komorowo and Beniaminów (Poland)
- Stalag 334 in Bila Tserkva (Ukraine)
- Stalag 335 in Stryj and Drohobycz (Poland)
- Stalag 336 in Kaunas (Lithuania)
- Stalag 337 in Leśna (Poland) and Mantua (Italy)

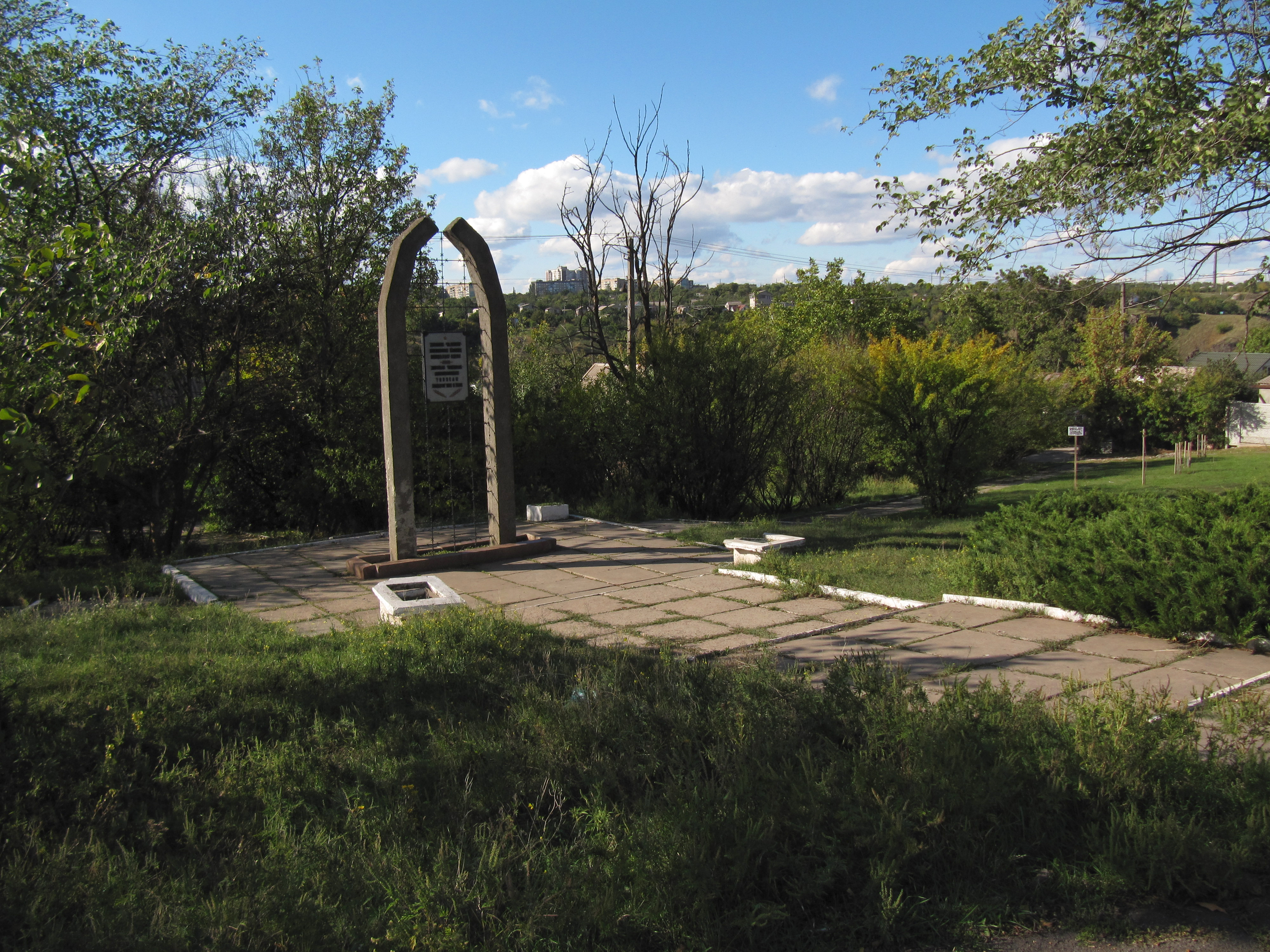
Memorial to the victims of the Stalag 338 camp in Kryvyi Rih

- Stalag 338 in Kietrz (Poland), Kryvyi Rih and Voznesensk (Ukraine), Reni (Romania)
- Stalag 339 in Kyiv-Darnytsia and Berdychiv (Ukraine)
- Stalag 340 in Daugavpils (Latvia)
- Stalag 341 in Altengrabow (Germany), Slutsk and Mogilev (Belarus)
- Stalag 342 in Mołodeczno (Poland)
- Stalag 343 in Alytus (Lithuania) and Babruysk (Belarus)
- Stalag 344 in Vilnius (Lithuania) and Łambinowice (Poland)
- Stalag 345 in Smila (Ukraine) and Zagreb (Croatia)
- Stalag 346 in Kremenchuk and Starokostiantyniv (Ukraine)
- Stalag 347 in Rēzekne (Latvia) and Valga (Estonia)
- Stalag 348 in Rzeszów (Poland) and Dnipropetrovsk (Ukraine)
- Stalag 349 in Uman (Ukraine)
- Stalag 350 in Riga (Latvia)

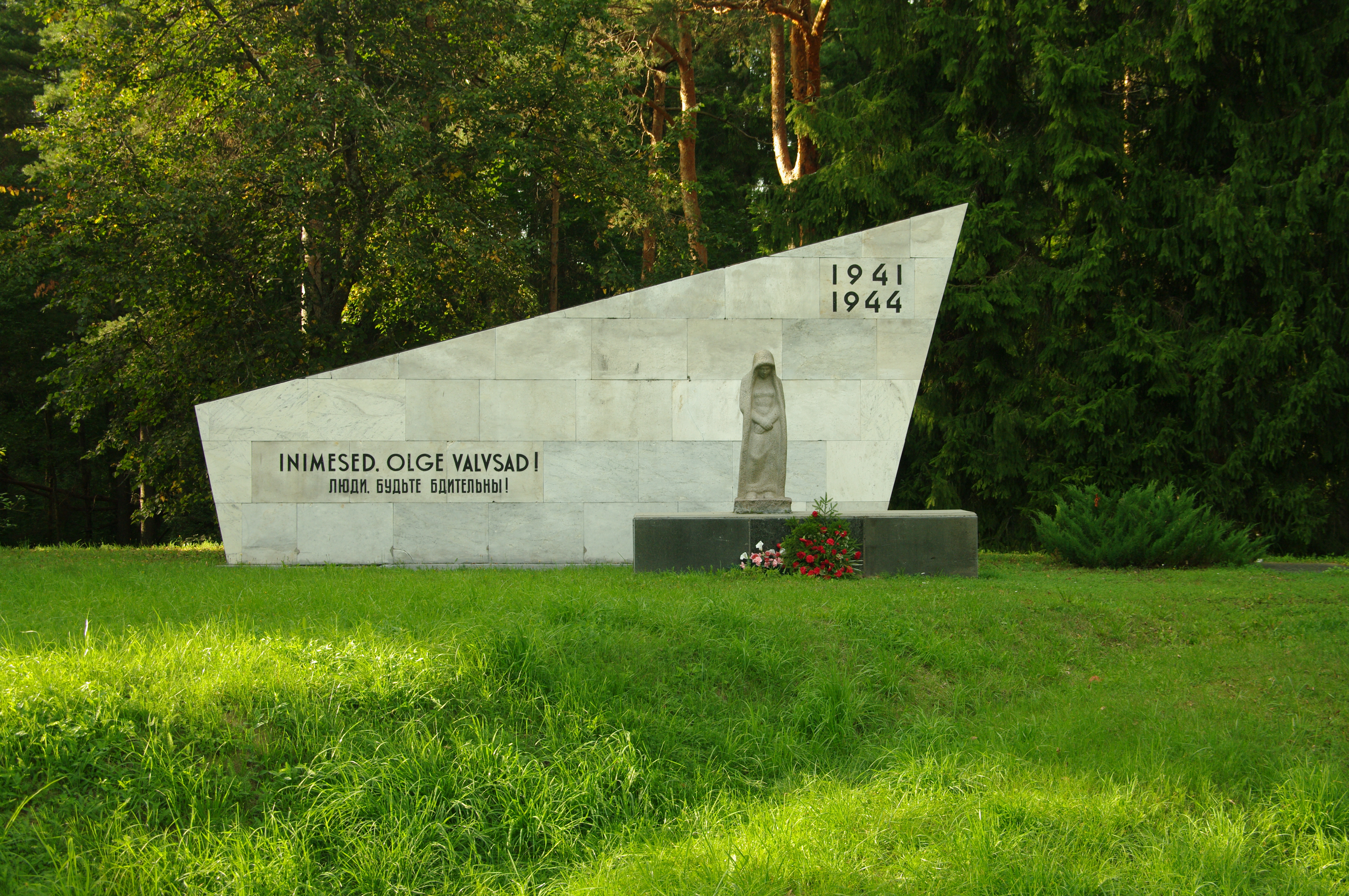
Memorial at the site of the Stalag 351 camp in Valga

- Stalag 351 in Berezwecz (Poland), Valga (Estonia), Głubczyce and Barkniewko (Poland)
- Stalag 352 in Minsk (Belarus)
- Stalag 353 in Grodno (Poland) and Orsha (Belarus)
- Stalag 354 in Baravukha (Belarus)
- Stalag 355 in Neusiedl am See (Austria), Proskuriv (Ukraine), Düren and Oerbke (Germany)
- Stalag 357 in Shepetivka, Poltava, Slavuta (Ukraine), Toruń (Poland) and Oerbke (Germany)
- Stalag 358 in Zhytomir (Ukraine)
- Stalag 359 in Sokolov (Czechoslovakia), Poniatowa and Sandomierz (Poland), Znamianka and Borysivka (Ukraine)
- Stalag 360 in Równe and Żytyń Wielki (Poland)
- Stalag 361 in Šiauliai (Lithuania)
- Stalag 362 in Slutsk (Belarus)
- Stalag 363 in Poznań (Poland), Kharkiv and Kremenchuk (Ukraine), and Plauen (Germany)
- Stalag 364 in Rzeszów (Poland) and Mykolaiv (Ukraine)
- Stalag 365 in Włodzimierz (Poland) and Novara (Italy)
- Stalag 366 in Siedlce (Poland)
- Stalag 367 in Częstochowa and Tułowice (Poland)
- Stalag 368 in Beniaminów (Poland)

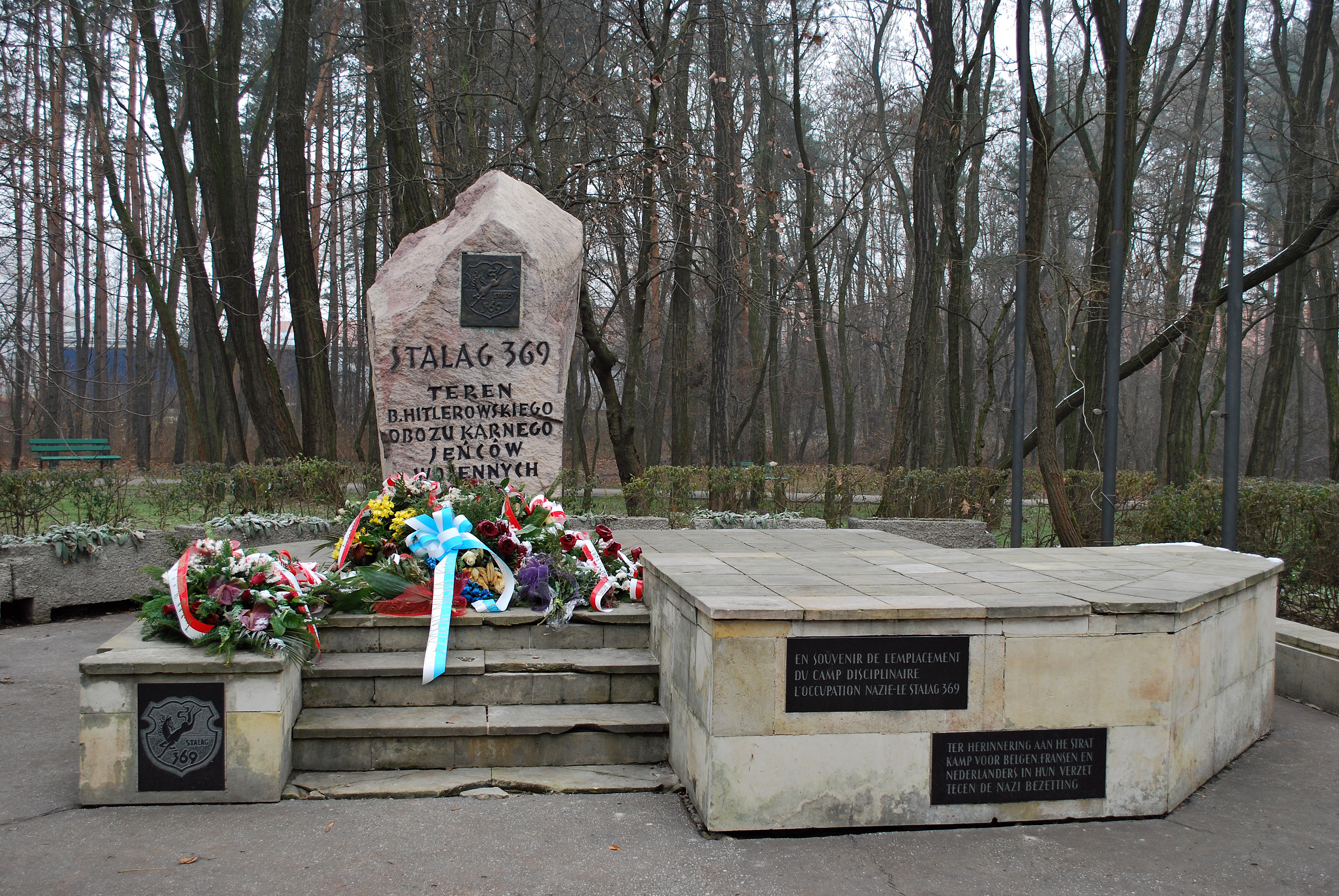
Memorial at the site of the Stalag 369 camp in Kobierzyn, Kraków

- Stalag 369 in Kobierzyn (Poland)
- Stalag 370 in Rzeszów (Poland), Kherson (Ukraine) and Simferopol (Russia)
- Stalag 371 in Stanisławów (Poland)
- Stalag 372 in Pskov (Russia)
- Stalag 373 in Babruysk (Belarus) and Prostki (Poland)
- Stalag 378 in Horlivka (Ukraine)
- Stalag 380 in Skarżysko-Kamienna (Poland), Oppdal and Dombås (Norway)
- Stalag 381 in Tapa (Estonia)
- Stalag 382 in Barysaw (Belarus)
- Stalag 383 in Hohenfels (Germany)
- Stalag 384 in Kursk (Russia), Konotop, Romny and Darnytsia (Ukraine)
- Stalag 385 in Chystiakove, Nikopol and Marhanets (Ukraine)
- Stalag 386 in Donetsk (Ukraine) and Shakhty (Russia)
- Stalag 387 in Donetsk and Dnipropetrovsk (Ukraine)
- Stalag 388 in Khorol (Ukraine)
- Stalag 391 in Copenhagen (Denmark)
- Stalag 397 in Yasynuvata, Donetsk, Zaporizhzhia, Kryvyi Rih (Ukraine), Oryol and Kromy (Russia)
- Stalag 398 between Pupping and Hartkirchen (Austria)
- Stalag XX-A (301) in Friesack, Wutzetz/Brandenburg, (Germany)

== Luftwaffe camps ==
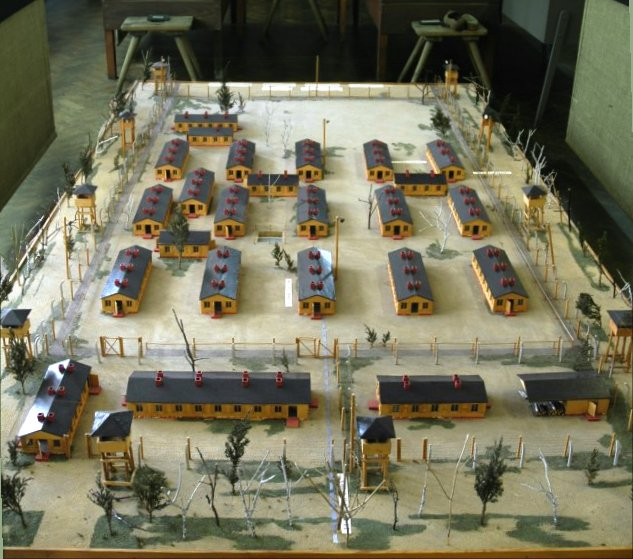
Diorama of Stalag Luft III

The camps for Allied airmen were run by the Luftwaffe independently of the Army.

- Dulag Luft Oberursel, Frankfurt
- Stalag Luft I in Barth
- Stalag Luft II in Barth (Germany) and Łódź (Poland)
- Stalag Luft III in Sagan (Żagań, Poland)
- Stalag Luft IV in Groß Tychow (Tychowo, Poland)
- Stalag Luft V in Halle/Saale
- Stalag Luft VI in Heydekrug (Šilutė, Lithuania)
- Stalag Luft VII in Morzyczyn and Bankau (Bąków, Poland)
- Stalag Luft VIII-B in Lamsdorf (Łambinowice, Poland)
- Stalag Luft XI-B

== Kriegsmarine camps ==
The camp for Allied seamen was run by the Kriegsmarine independently of the Army.

- Marlag und Milag Nord Westertimke
