= Dolgorukovo, Kaliningrad Oblast =

Settlement in Kaliningrad Oblast

Dolgorukovo Долгоруково
- Rural locality
- Interactive map of Dolgorukovo
- Location of Dolgorukovo Dolgorukovo (European Russia) Dolgorukovo (Russia)
- Coordinates: 54°25′N 20°31′E
- Country: Russia
- Federal subject: Kaliningrad Oblast

Population
  - Estimate (2010): 2,805 )
- Time zone: UTC+2 (MSK–1)
- Postal codes: 238430, 238437
- OKTMO ID: 27703000281

Dolgorukovo (Russian: Долгоруково, Polish: Stabławki) is a rural settlement in Bagrationovsky District of Kaliningrad Oblast, Russia, close to the border with Poland.

== History ==
The village was the location of the northern section of the Stalag I-A German prisoner-of-war camp, with the southern section located in Kamińsk, now on the other side of the border, in Poland. The camp was established on 6 September 1939, during the German invasion of Poland, which started World War II. It initially held Polish POWs, then also French and Belgian POWs from 1940, Soviet POWs from 1941, Italian POWs from 1943, plus also smaller numbers of British and Serbian POWs. In January 1945, the prisoners were sent on a death march westwards, whereas some 240 Soviet, Polish and French POWs who could not walk were left in the camp.

== Sights ==
There is an international cemetery of prisoners of the Stalag I-A German prisoner-of-war camp from World War II in the village.
