= Oflag XVII-A =

World War II German prisoner-of-war camp

- Edelbach, Lower Austria

Site information
- Type: Prisoner-of-war camp
- Controlled by: Nazi Germany

Location
- Edelbach, Austria
- Coordinates: 48.656°N 15.312°E

Site history
- In use: 1940 – 1945
- Battles/wars: World War II

Garrison information
- Occupants: French and Polish officers

Oflag XVII-A was a German Army World War II prisoner-of-war camp for officers (Offizierlager) located between the villages of Edelbach and Döllersheim in the district of Zwettl in the Waldviertel region of north-eastern Austria.

== Camp history ==
The camp was originally built as barracks for troops taking part in military exercises in Truppenübungsplatz Döllersheim, which with an area of 200 km^{2} (77 sq mi), was the largest military training area in Central Europe. It had been created by the German Army in 1938, and some 7,000 inhabitants of 45 villages were removed and resettled.

The barracks were enclosed by a barbed-wire fence and watchtowers to form a camp approximately 440 by 530 m (480 by 580 yd), which was opened in June 1940 to house officers, mostly French, captured in the Battle of France, as well as several hundred Poles. Approximately 6,000 officers and orderlies were in the camp. The guards were mainly Austrian army veterans and conditions in the camp were better than in many other POW camps in Germany.

The POWs lived in barrack huts that were divided into two dormitories each housing around 100 men, with a small kitchen and a washroom between them. There was a separate shower block, and prisoners were allowed two showers a month. Part of one barrack was set aside for use as a chapel.

=== POW activities ===
The prisoners were encouraged to occupy their time productively. They formed a choir and a theatre group, and built their own sports ground, the Stade Pétain. One of the most popular activities were the lectures at the Université en Captivité, headed by Lieutenant Jean Leray, formerly a mathematics professor at the Université de Nancy. The University awarded almost 500 degrees, all of which were officially confirmed after the war. Leray lectured mainly on calculus and topology, concealing his expertise in fluid dynamics and mechanics since he feared being forced to work on German military projects. He also studied algebraic topology, publishing several papers after the war on spectral sequences and sheaf theory. Other notable figures of the University were the embryologist Étienne Wolff and the geologist François Ellenberger. The syllabus also included such subjects as law, biology, psychology, Arabic, music, moral theology, and astronomy.

The prisoners produced a weekly newspaper, Le Canard en KG. "KG" is the German abbreviation for Kriegsgefangener ("Prisoner of War"), and in French this was pronounced as Le canard encagé ("The Caged Duck"), a reference to the popular satirical journal Le Canard enchaîné.

A more clandestine production was the 30-minute film entitled Sous le Manteau ("Under The Cloak"), directed by Marcel Corre. It was shot on 14 reels of 8 mm film on a camera hidden inside a hollowed-out dictionary, and recorded scenes of daily life in the camp, including prisoners at work on one of the 32 tunnels, totalling over 1 km (0.62 mi) in length, that were dug during the camp's lifetime. According to Robert Christophe, Oflag XVII-A had a Gaullist resistance group called "La Maffia", which had ties to a French Resistance group (apparently the only such collaboration between prisoners outside France and resistance inside it), and thus acquired the materials for the camera as well as for escape attempts.

=== Escape ===
The prisoners established an open-air theatre, the Théâtre de la Verdure, and were allowed to decorate it with branches and greenery, partially obscuring the view of the guards. After protests by the International Red Cross that the camp lacked protection against air raids, the prisoners were given shovels and wheelbarrows to dig slit trenches, and in one by the theatre they started a tunnel which eventually stretched for 90 m (300 ft) out and under the wire. On the night of 17 September 1943 a large group of prisoners escaped. Most posed as French civilian workers, of whom there were many in Germany at the time. Their disappearance went unnoticed the next day, so the next night another group escaped, a total of 132 men altogether. Some of the first escapees were recaptured and returned to the camp before the escape had even been discovered by the camp authorities. Only two of the escapees managed to return to France. Soon afterwards a delegation of high-ranking German officers inspected the camp, and the prisoners were warned that "escaping is no longer a sport". Six months later, after 76 Allied airmen escaped from Stalag Luft III, 50 were summarily executed.

=== Liberation ===
On 17 April 1945, the camp was evacuated in the face of the approaching Red Army. The prisoners were marched towards Linz, some 128 km (80 mi) to the west. The column generally covered less than 10 km (6.2 mi) a day, and steadily diminished in size as prisoners took advantage of the dense forests to slip away. By May 10, when news of the German surrender reached them, half the POWs had vanished. The camp was liberated by the Russians on 9 May 1945.

== Post-war ==
In the immediate post-war period the camp was used by the Soviets to hold German Army prisoners. From early 1946 the Soviets began to use the military training area themselves, and at its peak there were up to 60,000 Russian soldiers stationed there. Following the end of the Allied occupation in 1955 the area was taken over by the Austrian Army, and in 1957 around 160 km^{2} (62 sq mi) was returned to civilian ownership, while the remainder remains under military control as Truppenübungsplatz-Allentsteig.

== See also ==
- List of prisoner-of-war camps in Germany
- Roger Collinson, British 4th Nov 1943 to 4th May 1945 Eighth Army Captured in North Africa
