= Barkniewko =

Abandoned village in Poland

- Former village
- Location within Poland
- Coordinates: 53°31′55″N 16°43′1″E
- Country: Poland
- Voivodeship: West Pomeranian
- County: Szczecinek
- Gmina: Borne Sulinowo
- Time zone: UTC+1 (CET)
  - Summer (DST): UTC+2 (CEST)
- Vehicle registration: ZSZ

Barkniewko ([barkˈɲɛfkɔ]) is an abandoned village in the administrative district of Gmina Borne Sulinowo, within Szczecinek County, West Pomeranian Voivodeship, in northern Poland.

== History ==
During World War II, Nazi Germany operated three prisoner-of-war camps in the village, first Stalag 302 for regular soldiers from August 1941 to early 1942, then Stalag 351, also for regular soldiers, from June to December 1944, and the Oflag 65 prisoner-of-war camp for Serbian officers from September 1944 to January 1945.
