= Oflag VIII-F =

- Wahlstatt, Silesia (now Legnickie Pole, Poland)
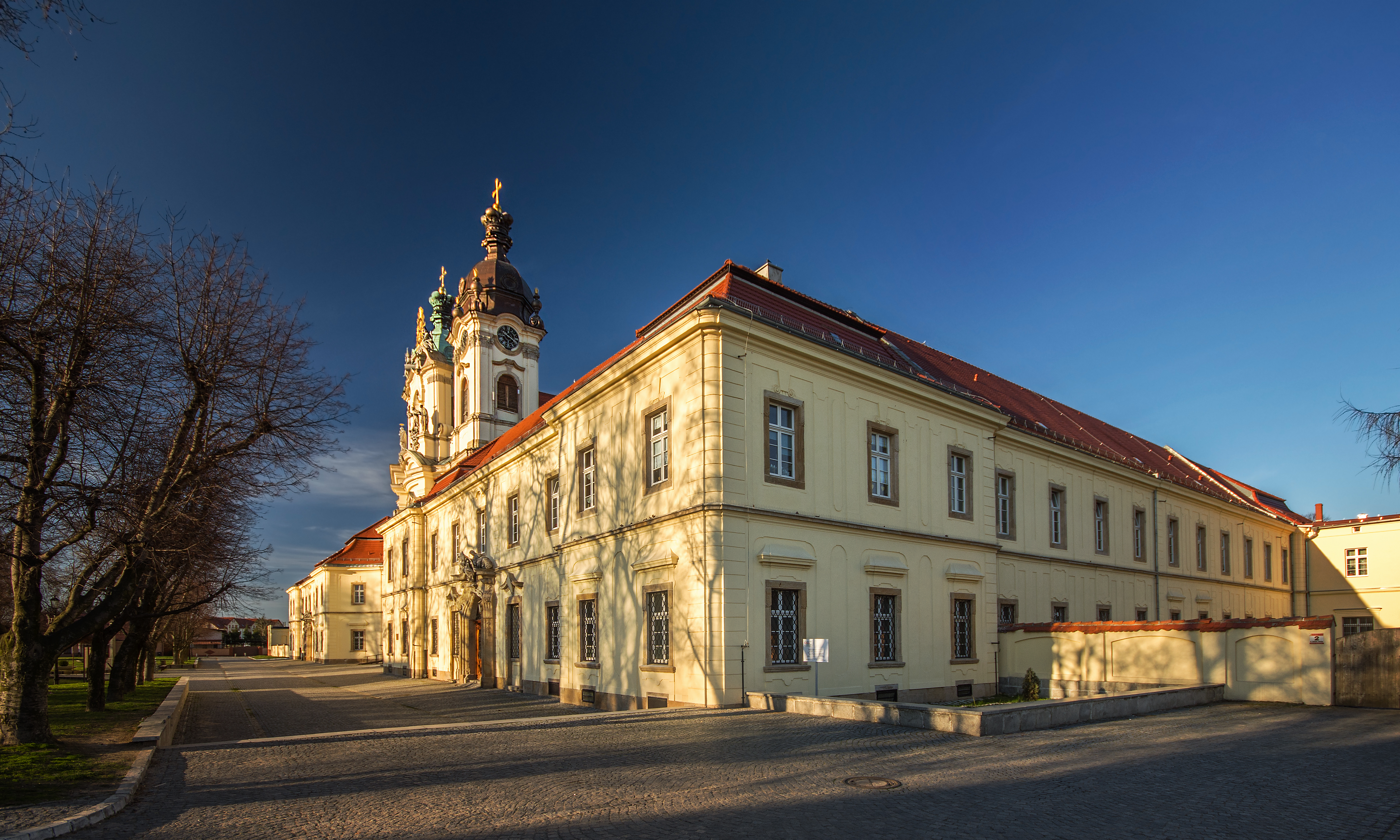
- Benedictine Abbey in Legnickie Pole

Site information
- Type: Prisoner-of-war camp
- Controlled by: Nazi Germany

Location
- Coordinates: 51.145413°N 16.243226°E

Site history
- Built: 1719-1731
- In use: 1940–1944
- Battles/wars: World War II

Garrison information
- Occupants: Allied POWs

Oflag VIII-F was a World War II German prisoner-of-war camp for officers (Offizierlager) located first in Wahlstatt, Silesia (now Legnickie Pole, Poland) and then at Mährisch-Trübau, Protectorate of Bohemia and Moravia (now Moravská Třebová, Czech Republic). It housed mostly French POWs.

== Camp history ==
Oflag VIII-F was first established at Wahlstatt in July 1940 and housed French and Belgian officers taken prisoner during the Battle of France. It was located in a former Benedictine Abbey dedicated to Saint Hedwig of Silesia, that had been a military school between 1840 and 1920, and used by the Nazis as a "National Political Educational Institution" from 1934.

In July 1942 a new camp at Moravská Třebová in German-occupied Czechoslovakia, about 200 km (120 mi) to the south, was designated Oflag VIII-F, while the original camp was redesignated Oflag VIII F/Z, a sub-camp of Moravská Třebová. The prisoners were transferred to other camps, though a small number stayed behind to carry out construction work as the site was adapted for the use of GEMA (Gesellschaft für und mechanische elektroakustische apparate) in developing radar systems. The sub-camp was closed in June 1943.

The camp at Moravská Třebová contained around 2,000 officers, mostly British captured in North Africa and the Greek Islands, but there were also numbers of Greek, French and American POW. In April 1944, most of the prisoners were transferred to Oflag 79 near Braunschweig and the camp was closed.

== See also ==
- List of prisoner-of-war camps in Germany
- Oflag
