= Stalag IV-F =

- Hartmannsdorf bei Chemnitz, Saxony

Site information
- Type: Prisoner-of-war camp
- Controlled by: Nazi Germany

Location
- Germany, 1937
- Coordinates: 50.8717°N 12.8362°E

Site history
- In use: 1941–1945
- Battles/wars: World War II

Garrison information
- Occupants: Mostly French, British and Soviet POWs, plus Serbian, American, Czechoslovak, Belgian, Dutch, Polish, Romanian, Italian and other Allied POWs

Stalag IV-F was a German World War II prisoner-of-war camp in Hartmannsdorf, Saxony. It held predominantly French, British and Soviet POWs, but also Serbian, American, Czechoslovak, Belgian, Dutch, Polish, Romanian, Italian and other Allied POWs.

== Camp history ==
Opened in February 1941, the camp held mainly French troops captured during the battle of France, and British captured in North Africa. The POWs were assigned to various Arbeitskommando ("Work detachments") locally. The camp was liberated by American forces in March 1945.

The camp had 790 forced labour units as of April 1944, where conditions were poor, with only a few exceptions.

Several hundreds Poles were imprisoned in the camp after the German suppression of the Warsaw Uprising of 1944, with 191 Polish women who fought in the uprising particularly mistreated by the Germans in the camp.

The camp was liberated by American troops on April 14, 1945.

== See also ==
- List of prisoner-of-war camps in Germany

== Bibliography ==
- Elvio Carnaghi and Andrea Balzarotti, L'inferno nascosto, ed. Zeisciu, Magenta 2022, ISBN 9788887405644
