= Dłutowo, Warmian-Masurian Voivodeship =

Settlement in Poland

Dłutowo
- Settlement
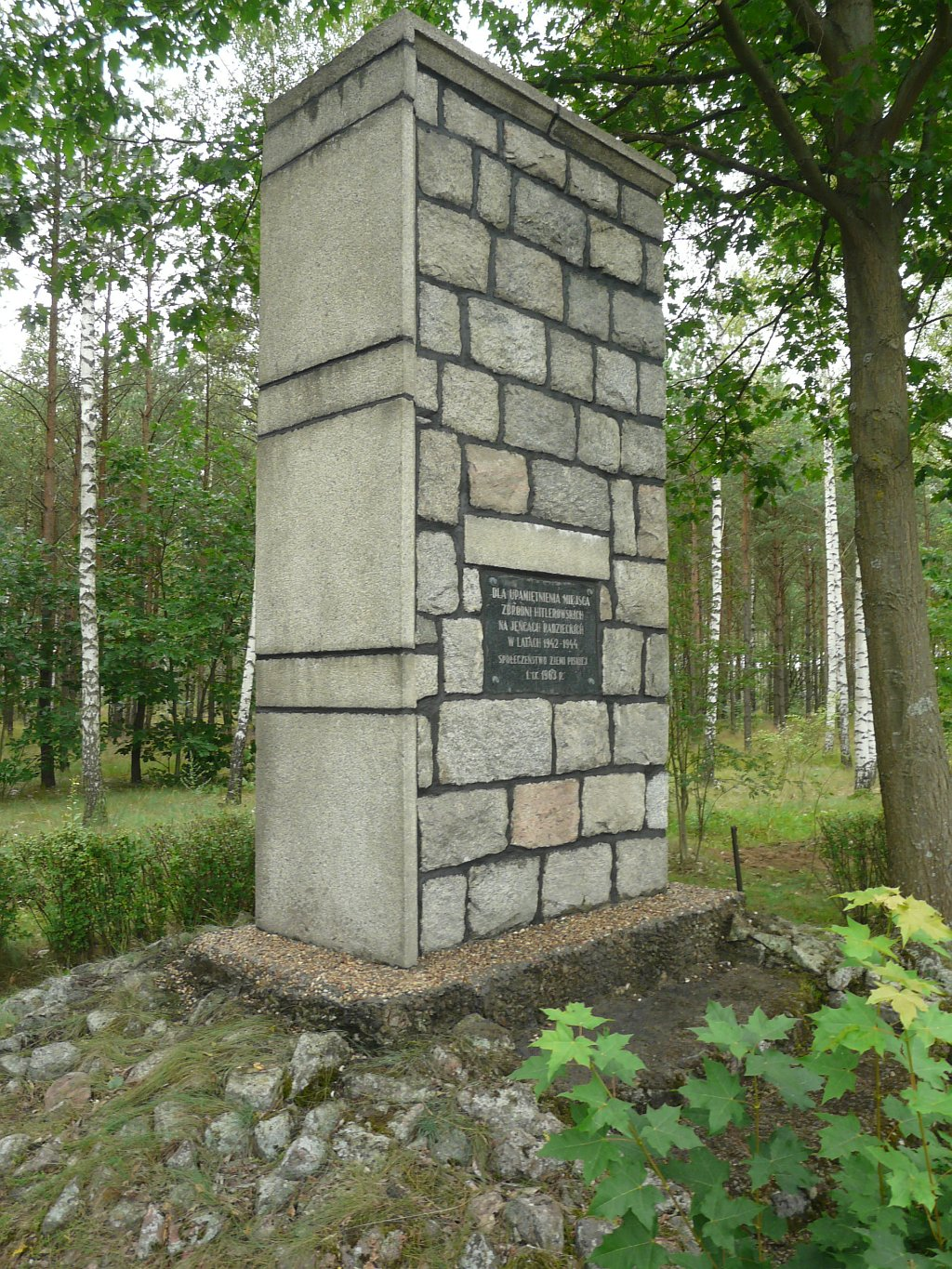
- Memorial to the victims of the former German POW camps

- Location within Poland
- Coordinates: 53°28′32″N 21°52′24″E
- Country: Poland
- Voivodeship: Warmian-Masurian
- County: Pisz
- Gmina: Pisz
- Time zone: UTC+1 (CET)
  - Summer (DST): UTC+2 (CEST)
- Vehicle registration: NPI

Dłutowo [dwuˈtɔvɔ] is a settlement in the administrative district of Gmina Pisz, within Pisz County, Warmian-Masurian Voivodeship, in north-eastern Poland. It is located in the region of Masuria.

== History ==
As of 1539, the population of the village was solely Polish. In 1881, the village had a population of 122.

Under Nazi Germany, the village was renamed to Fischborn in attempt to erase traces of Polish origin, and was the site of the Oflag 63 prisoner-of-war camp and a subcamp of the Stalag I-F POW camp.

After World War II, the historic Polish name Dłutowo was restored.
