= Hartmannsdorf, Mittelsachsen =

Hartmannsdorf
- Municipality
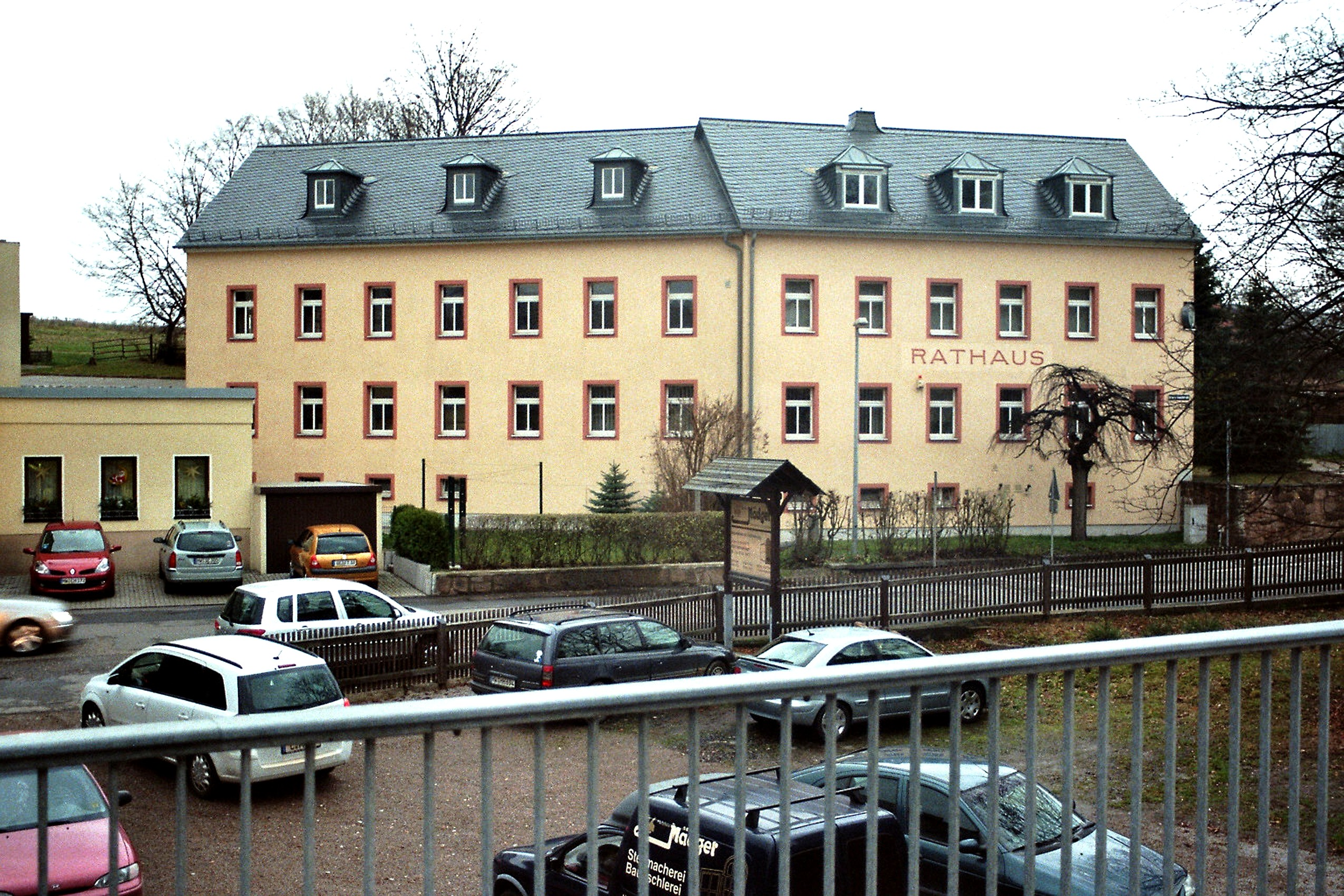
- Hartmannsdorf town hall

- Coat of arms

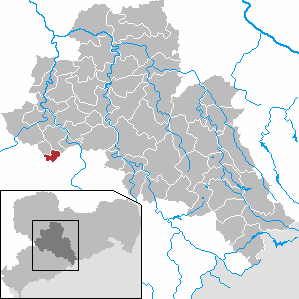
- Location of Hartmannsdorf within Mittelsachsen district
- Interactive map of Hartmannsdorf
- Location within Germany Location within Saxony
- Coordinates: 50°53′12″N 12°47′58″E
- Country: Germany
- State: Saxony
- District: Mittelsachsen

Government
  - Mayor (2022–29): Uwe Weinert (CDU)

Area
  - Total: 10.29 km^{2} (3.97 sq mi)
- Elevation: 236 m (774 ft)

Population (2025-12-31)
  - Total: 4,452
  - Density: 432.7/km^{2} (1,121/sq mi)
- Time zone: UTC+01:00 (CET)
  - Summer (DST): UTC+02:00 (CEST)
- Postal codes: 09232
- Dialling codes: 03722
- Vehicle registration: FG
- Website: www.gemeinde-hartmannsdorf.de

Hartmannsdorf (German pronunciation: [ˈhaʁtmansdɔʁf]) is a small municipality in the district Mittweida, Saxony, in eastern Germany, near the city of Chemnitz. As of 2020 it has a population of 4,428.

== History ==
During World War II, in February 1941, the Stalag IV-F prisoner-of-war camp was established in Hartmannsdorf. It held French, British, Soviet, Serbian, American, Czechoslovak, Belgian, Dutch, Polish, Romanian, Italian and other Allied POWs, including Polish women who fought in the Warsaw Uprising of 1944. The camp was liberated by American troops in April 1945.

== Economy ==
The Diamant works in Hartmannsdorf are the oldest producing bicycle factory in Germany. Since 2004 it has been the site for the European production of Trek Bicycle Corporation. Trek took over the Villiger-Diamant production facility which they had purchased in 2003.

== Twin towns ==
- Schönaich, Germany
