= Sous le Manteau =

1948 documentary

Sous le Manteau (literally Under the Cloak; usually translated as Clandestinely) is a French documentary consisting of footage shot clandestinely by French officers held during World War II in Oflag XVII-A, a POW camp in northeastern Austria.

== Background and filming ==
Oflag XVII-A was a prisoner-of-war camp operated by Nazi Germany in Austria, on the border of Czechoslovakia. Its 40 barracks housed five thousand French prisoners of war captured during the Battle of France. According to Robert Christophe, in his making-of booklet on the film, Oflag XVII-A had a Gaullist resistance group called "La Maffia", which had ties to a French Resistance group (apparently the only such collaboration between prisoners outside France and resistance inside it), and thus acquired the materials for the camera (and supplies for escape attempts).

Taking advantage of humanitarian packages from France, the prisoners smuggled in materials necessary for the construction and operation of a camera. Film was sent from France in packets with food for prisoners; they were hidden in sausages and other foods, and after being developed the negatives were hidden in the heels of the prisoners' boots (the footage documents such detail). Fourteen rolls were filmed by March 1945. The camera was made from a wooden box, which was hidden in a Larousse dictionary; the spine of this dictionary was capable of being opened like a shutter.

== Content ==
The 30-minute film documents daily life in the camp, including a theater production, food distribution, as well as a surprise raid by the Nazi guards. The film even documents the digging of tunnels for several escape attempts. One, of which parts are documented in the film, resulted in 132 prisoners escaping; only two made it back to France.

== Legacy ==
After the camp was liberated by the Soviets the rolls were hidden in a mess tin and given to the French liaison officer for General Jean de Lattre de Tassigny. A booklet by Christopher about the making of the film was published in 1948 by Éditions OPTA. Sous le Manteau has been distributed by Armor Films, with commentary by Maurice Renault and Robert Christophe.

The BBC's Christian Fraser described it as "so professional ... that on first viewing you would be forgiven for thinking it is a post-war reconstruction."
