= Stalag V-A =

- Ludwigsburg, Baden-Württemberg
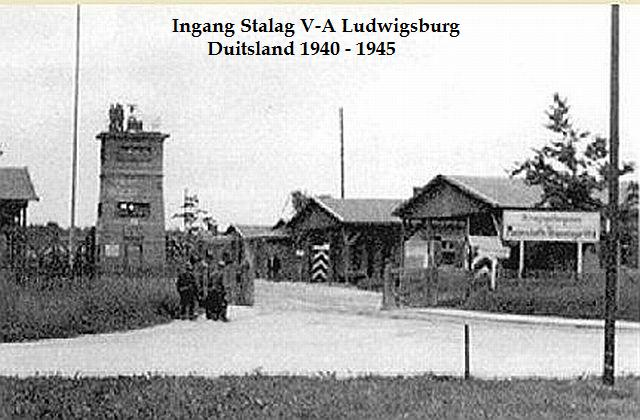
- Stalag V-A in 1944

Site information
- Type: Prisoner-of-war camp
- Controlled by: Nazi Germany

Location
- Ludwigsburg, Germany (pre-war borders, 1937)
- Coordinates: 48.88°N 9.19°E

Site history
- In use: 1939–1945
- Battles/wars: World War II

Garrison information
- Occupants: Polish, Belgian, Dutch, French, British, Soviet, Italian, American and other Allied prisoners of war

Stalag V-A was a German World War II prisoner-of-war camp (Stammlager) located on the southern outskirts of Ludwigsburg, Germany. It housed Allied POWs of various nationalities, including Poles, Belgians, Dutchmen, Frenchmen, British, Soviets, Italians and Americans.

== Operation ==
The prison camp had been constructed on the site of a former German military camp, that had once billeted German cavalry troops and their horses. The red brick stables were converted to barracks to house prisoners when the site was converted to a POW camp in October 1939. Additional wooden barrack huts were also constructed on the grounds, to accommodate the camp's growing prisoner population.

The roofs of the buildings within the camp were marked "KG" for Kriegsgefangenen, the German word meaning "prisoner of war". Large red crosses were also painted on the roofs, to further ensure that Allied planes would not mistakenly target the camp.

The sprawling prison complex was divided into compounds. The perimeter of the each compound was secured by a double barbed-wire fence, fifteen feet in height, on top of which ran a high-voltage wire. The space between the two fences was a tangled mass of barbed-wire. On the prisoners' side of the fence, a wire ran parallel with the fence, staked to the ground approximately ten feet from the fence, six to eight inches above the ground. Any man who stepped between the wire and the fence was shot on sight. Every so many yards along the fence was a guard tower, fully armed and manned.

The first prisoners detained at the camp had been Poles, taken captive during the German invasion of Poland in 1939. As the war progressed, prisoners of other nationalities arrived at Stalag V-A. By the time of the camp's evacuation in April 1945, Allied prisoners of every nation at war with Germany were present within the camp. The largest population present within the camp was Soviet, followed by the French, Belgian, Dutch, British and Commonwealth, Italian, and American prisoners were also present in large numbers.

=== Timeline ===
- 1935. A German military camp is constructed on the southern edge of Ludwigsburg. The site included a warehouse, 17 barracks, and a number of horse stables.
- October 1939. The camp at Ludwigsburg is converted to a prisoner-of-war camp, to accommodate Polish prisoners taken captive during the German invasion of Poland.
- May 1940. Belgian, Dutch and French prisoners arrived that had been captured during the Battle of France. British prisoners captured at Dunkirk also arrive in the camp. On 15 October 1940 the family of Helene Pitrou was informed by the Red Cross that her father Lucien Pitrou of 42e R.I.F. was interned in the camp.
- 1941–1942. Many Soviet prisoners arrived, but they were kept in separate enclosures and received much harsher treatment. Thousands died of malnutrition and disease.
- Most of the lower rank soldiers were transferred to Labor camps in the area to work in factories, repairing roads and railroads, working on farms. However, the administration of these Arbeitskommandos remained at the main camp, which was also responsible for dividing up International Red Cross packages and mail service.
- 1944. Following the Allied landings at Normandy and the subsequent fighting in France, American prisoners begin to arrive at the camp. American prisoners were held in the same compound as the French, Belgian, and Italian prisoners.
- The camp is evacuated on the evening of Easter, April 1, 1945. Prisoners detained at the camp, at the time of evacuation, take part in a forced march across southern Germany.

=== Escapes ===
There were several attempts to escape, primarily from Arbeitskommandos. One such escape attempt was by the Dutch prisoner Arie Verouden in October 1943. He was recaptured in December and sentenced to two years solitary confinement.

== Aftermath ==
After the end of the war, thousands of Displaced Persons, mostly Poles were housed here, but were quickly transferred to permanent buildings of German Army barracks around the city.

== See also ==
- List of prisoner-of-war camps in Germany
