= Stalag I-F =

WWII POW camp

- Suwałki, German-occupied Poland
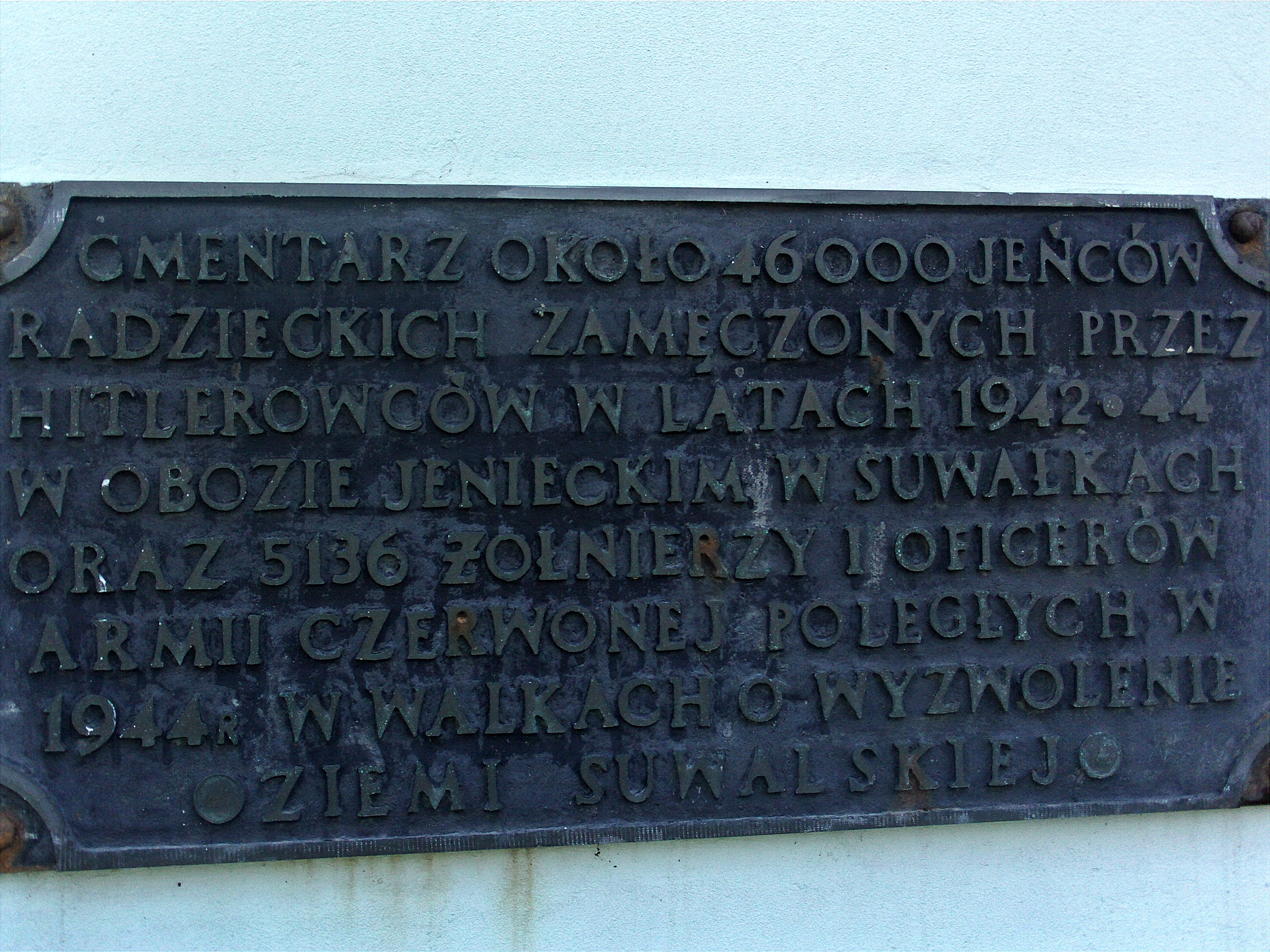
- Memorial plaque at the cemetery of the victims in Suwałki

Site information
- Type: Prisoner-of-war camp
- Controlled by: Nazi Germany

Location
- Poland
- Coordinates: 54.1219°N 22.9345°E

Site history
- Built: 1940
- In use: 1941–1944
- Battles/wars: World War II

Garrison information
- Occupants: Allied (mostly Soviet) prisoners of war

Stalag I-F was a German World War II prisoner-of-war camp located just north of the city of Suwałki in German-occupied Poland.

== Camp history ==
Construction of the camp began in April 1941, before the attack on the Soviet Union, to accommodate the expected POWs. It was carried out by French and Polish prisoners. The camp opened in May 1941 as Oflag 68, but was renamed Stalag I-F in June 1942.

Covering 50 hectares (120 acres) the camp contained a kitchen, bakery, latrines and bathhouse, and was surrounded by a double barbed-wire fence with five gates and four guard towers (later increased to nine). The prisoners lived outdoors in dugouts until 1943 when 43 barrack huts were built, though due to overcrowding, many were still forced to live underground.

More than 100,000 prisoners, mostly Russian, passed through Stalag I-F, of whom over 50,000 died, mostly from malnutrition, exposure and typhus. Even Italian Royal Army soldiers captured by the Germans after 1943, September 8. were imprisoned in this camp. In October 1944, as the Red Army approached, the guards abandoned the camp leaving the prisoners behind.

== Sub-camps of Stalag I-F ==
There were also six Zweiglager ("sub-camps"), designated Stalag I-F/Z:

- Prostki (Prostken)
- Dłutowo (Fischborn)
- Ciechanów (Zichenau)
- Liese über Mischienitz, Zichenau
- Nesterov (Ebenrode)
- Priekulė (Prökuls)

== See also ==
- List of prisoner-of-war camps in Germany
