= Oflag 79 =

World War II German prisoner-of-war camp

- Braunschweig, Germany
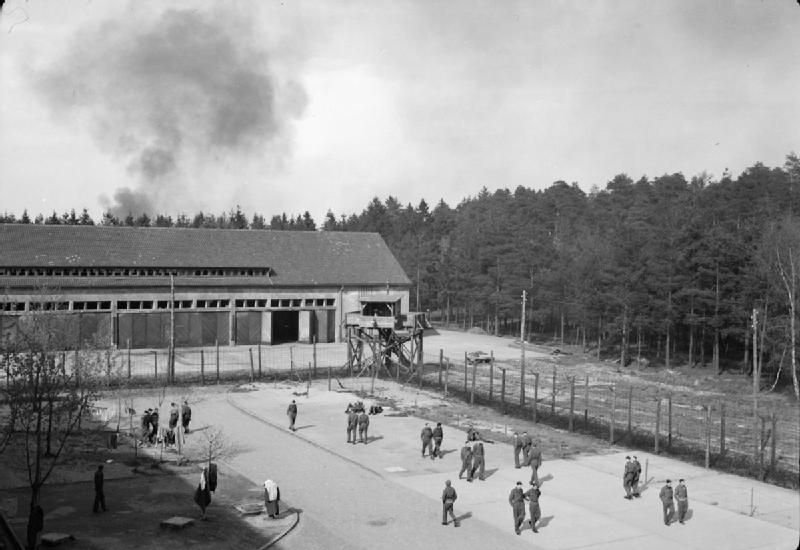
- British POWs at Oflag 79, April 1945.

Site information
- Type: Prisoner-of-war camp
- Controlled by: Nazi Germany

Location
- Braunschweig, Germany, (pre-war borders, 1937)
- Location within Germany
- Coordinates: 52.3080°N 10.5581°E

Site history
- In use: 1943-1945
- Battles/wars: World War II

Garrison information
- Occupants: About 2,500 British & Commonwealth officers

Oflag 79 was a German World War II prisoner-of-war camp for Allied officers. The camp was located at Waggum near Braunschweig in Germany, also known by the English name of Brunswick. It was located in a three-story brick building that had previously been the home of a German parachute regiment, near the Hermann Göring aircraft engine factory.

== Camp history ==
Offizierslager 79 ("Officers Camp 79") was established in December 1943 with men transferred from camps in Italy, mainly British Commonwealth officers from the Battle of Crete and North African Campaign. More prisoners arrived in July 1944 transferred from Oflag VIII-F. On 24 August 1944 the camp was strafed by American and British aircraft. Three men were killed, and 14 seriously wounded. The camp was liberated by the U.S. Ninth Army on 12 April 1945.

== In popular culture ==
- The British Free Corps was a subject for "The Hide", the final episode of series 6 of the British TV series Foyle's War, in which a British POW who had joined the BFC (James Devereux) was tried for treason in Great Britain once he returned home, after surviving the fire bombing of Dresden. The Germans had recruited the BFC members from prisoner of war camps; in the case of Devereux and his friend Jack, Oflag 79 in particular.

== See also ==
- List of prisoner-of-war camps in Germany
- Oflag
