= Stalag I-A =

German World War II prisoner-of-war camp at Stablack

- Stablack, Germany (now Kamińsk, Poland, and Dolgorukovo, Russia)
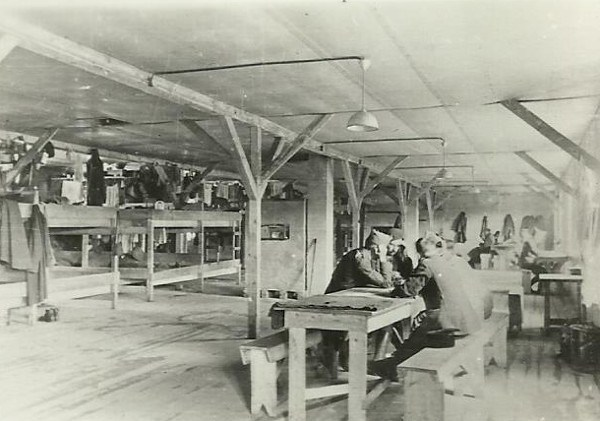

Site information
- Type: Prisoner-of-war camp
- Controlled by: Nazi Germany

Location
- Stablack, Germany (pre-war borders, 1937) Stalag I-A (Poland)
- Coordinates: 54.4166°N 20.5333°E

Site history
- Built: 1939
- In use: 1939–1945
- Battles/wars: World War II

Garrison information
- Occupants: Polish, Belgian, French, Soviet, British, Italian and Serbian prisoners of war

Stalag I-A was a German prisoner-of-war camp during World War II, located in the village of Stablack (now divided between Kamińsk, Poland, and Dolgorukovo, Russia). It housed mainly Polish, Belgian, French, Soviet and Italian prisoners of war, but also Britons and Serbs.

The camp was divided into two sections, the northern located at modern Dolgorukovo and southern at modern Kamińsk.

== History ==
The camp was established on 6 September 1939, during the German invasion of Poland, which started World War II. It was built in late 1939 by Polish POWs. In 1940 the Poles were joined by Belgian and French prisoners following the Fall of France, and by Russians in 1941 following the Operation Barbarossa. From 1943, also Italian POWs were held in the camp. Some British and Serbian prisoners were also there.

In January 1945, the prisoners were sent on a death march westwards, whereas some 240 Soviet, Polish and French POWs who could not walk were left in the camp.

== Kommandos of Stalag I-A ==
Few of the men registered at Stalag I-A were housed at the main camp, as most were assigned to Kommandos (sub-camps) spread over the entire district.

- E1, Central camp
- E2, Stablack hospital
- E3, Königsberg
- E4, Heinrichswalde
- E5, around Königsberg
- E6, Königsberg
- E7, Wehlau
- E8, Preußisch Eylau
- E9, Heilsberg (Lidzbark Warmiński)
- E10, Gerdauen
- E11, Heiligenbeil, sub-divided into five Zug; Heiligenbeil, Bladiau, Ludwigsort, Zinten and Lichtenfeld
- E12, Memel (Klaipėda)
- E13, Unknown
- E14, Labiau
- E16, Insterburg
- E17, Schlossberg
- E18, Gumbinnen
- E19, Ebenrode
- E20, Bartenstein (Bartoszyce)
- E34, Tilsit / Ragnit
- E44, Union Giesserei locomotive plant, Königsberg
- E45, Angerapp

== Commemoration ==
There is an international cemetery of prisoners of Stalag I-A in Dolgorukovo.

== See also ==
- List of prisoner-of-war camps in Germany
