= Stalag IV-G =

- Oschatz, Saxony
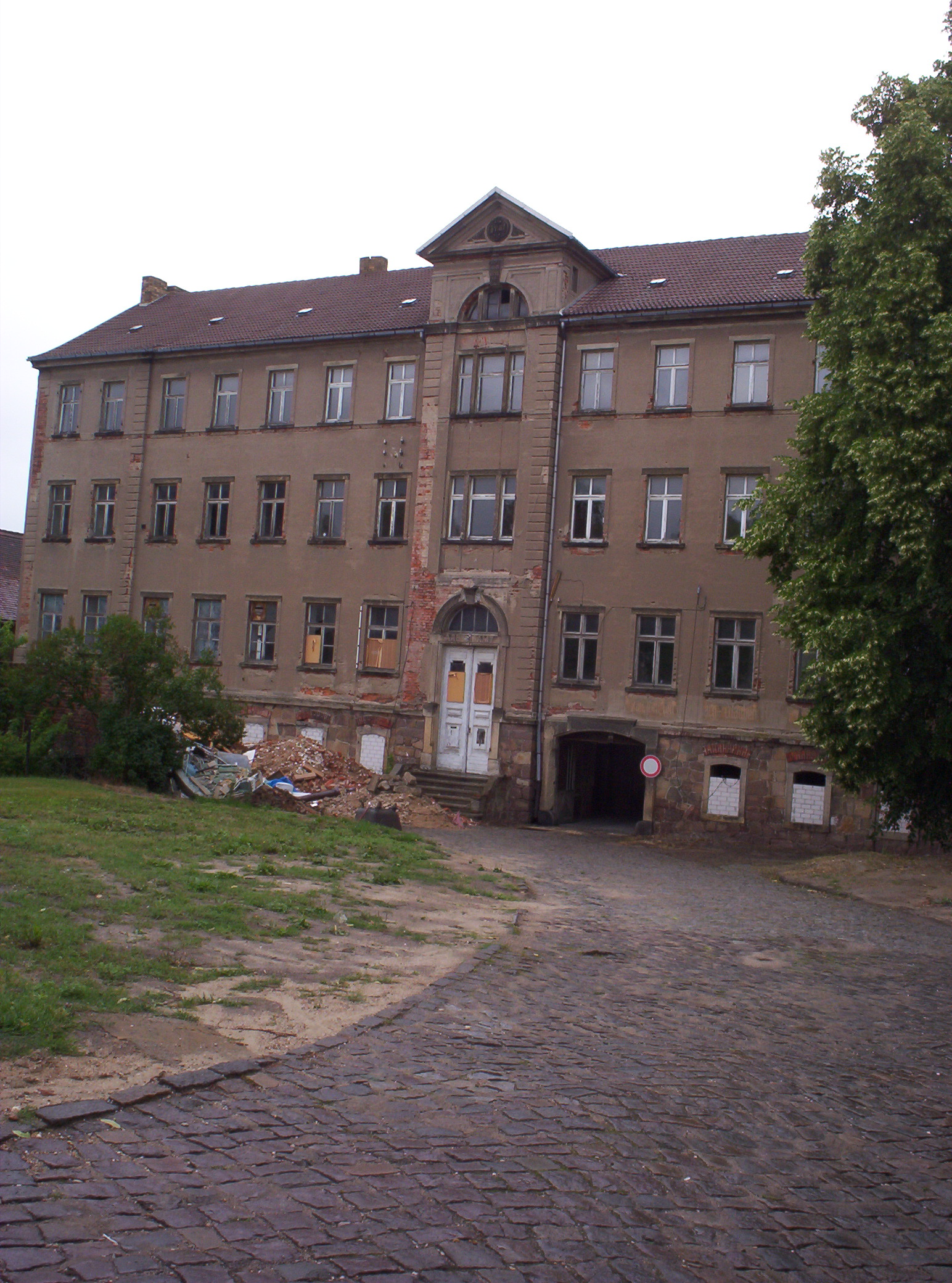
- Stalag IV-G headquarters building, 2003

Site information
- Type: Prisoner-of-war camp
- Controlled by: Nazi Germany

Location
- Oschatz, Germany (pre-war borders, 1937)
- Coordinates: 51.301398°N 13.108592°E

Site history
- In use: 1941–1945

Garrison information
- Occupants: British and American POWs

Stalag IV-G was a German World War II prisoner-of-war camp (Stammlager) for NCOs and enlisted men. It was not a camp in the usual sense, but a series of Arbeitslager ("Work Camps") scattered throughout the state of Saxony, administered from a central office on Lutherstraße in Oschatz, a small town situated between Leipzig and Dresden.

== Camp history ==
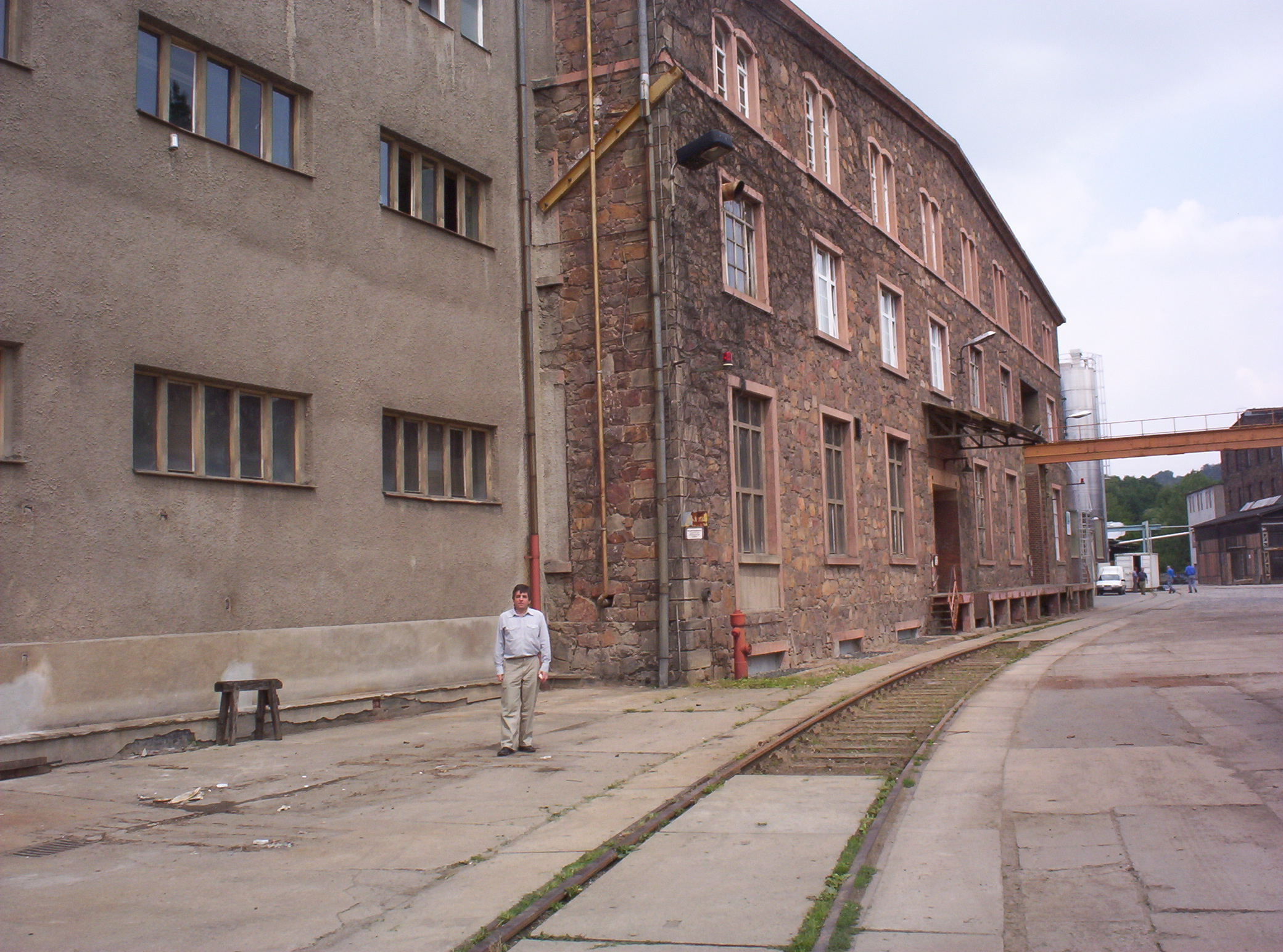
The work camp in Kriebethal, 2003

The camp operated from February 1941. The International Red Cross, following an inspection tour of 11–16 March 1945, reported that there were a total of 5,233 prisoners, of which 4,457 were British and Commonwealth, and 776 American. Of these only 20 POW were at the HQ in Oschatz, performing administration tasks, while the rest were assigned to 76 separate Arbeitskommando ("Work details"), working in agriculture, forestry, and industry. The Arbeitskommando varied in size from around 20 to over 100 men, who worked between 8 and 11 hours a day, 6 days a week, with only Sundays free. The report notes the generally poor health of the Americans, and some British, who were suffering from the effects of being marched from camps further east.

The area around Oschatz was one of the last to be liberated at the end of the war. In May 2005 the Oschatzer Heimatverein e.V. organised an exhibition to commemorate the liberation and Stalag IV-G. In 2007 the exhibition in the Oschatz Town Hall was made permanent.

== See also ==
- List of prisoner-of-war camps in Germany
