= Kamińsk, Warmian-Masurian Voivodeship =

Kamińsk
- Village
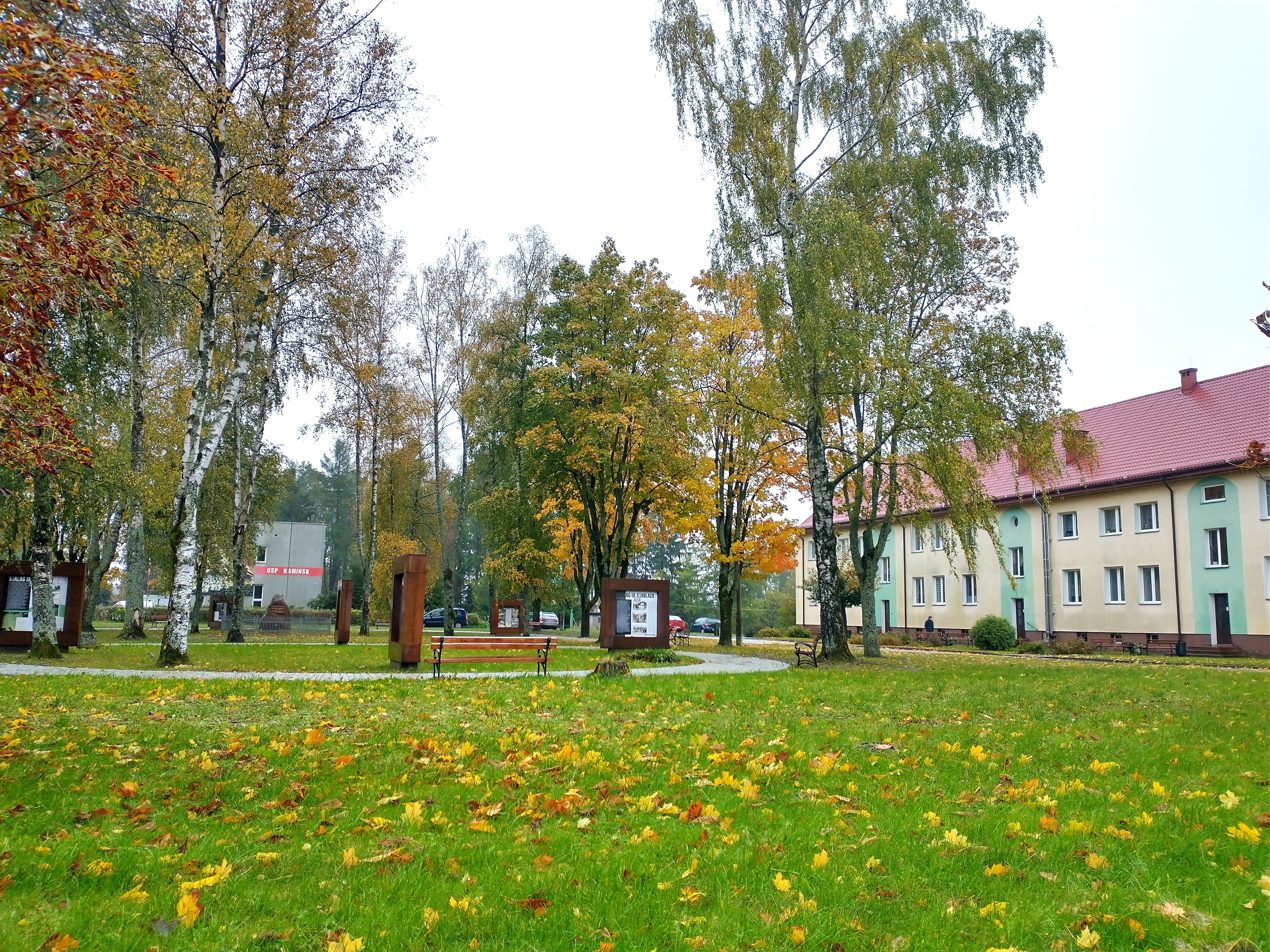

- Location within Poland
- Coordinates: 54°19′10″N 20°26′59″E
- Country: Poland
- Voivodeship: Warmian-Masurian
- County: Bartoszyce
- Gmina: Górowo Iławeckie

Population
  - Total: 1,000
- Time zone: UTC+1 (CET)
  - Summer (DST): UTC+2 (CEST)
- Vehicle registration: NBA

Kamińsk [ˈkamiɲsk] is a village in the administrative district of Gmina Górowo Iławeckie, within Bartoszyce County, Warmian-Masurian Voivodeship, in northern Poland, close to the border with the Kaliningrad Oblast of Russia.

During World War II, it was the location of the southern section of the German prisoner-of-war camp Stalag I-A. The camp was established on 6 September 1939, during the German invasion of Poland, which started World War II. It initially held Polish POWs, and then also French and Belgian POWs from 1940, Soviet POWs from 1941, Italian POWs from 1943, plus also smaller numbers of British and Serbian POWs. In 1950 Kamińsk prison was established in its place. Segments of it were burned down during a prison strike in 1981, which was part of a greater wave of unrest in Poland.
