= Edelbach, Allentsteig =

Coordinates: 48°41′00.8″N 15°24′28.4″E

Edelbach since 1 January 1964 is a cadastral community of Allentsteig in Lower Austria, Austria.

It has an area of 742.06 hectares (1,833.7 acres). In order to create the Döllersheim military training place, the inhabitants were resettled from 1938 onwards.
