= Dave Shannon =

Australian bomber pilot (1922–1993)

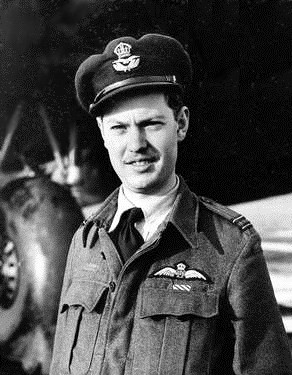
- Flight Lieutenant Shannon shortly before taking part in the "Dambusters" raid with No. 617 Squadron RAF, May 1943
- Born: 27 May 1922; Unley Park, South Australia
- Died: 8 April 1993 (aged 70); Denmark Hill, London, England
- Relatives: Howard Huntley Shannon (father); John Wallace Shannon (grandfather)
- Military career
- Allegiance: Australia
- Service/branch: Royal Australian Air Force
- Service years: 1940–45
- Rank: Squadron Leader
- Units: No. 106 Squadron RAF (1942–43); No. 617 Squadron RAF (1943–44); No. 511 Squadron RAF (1944–45); No. 246 Squadron RAF (1945)
- Conflicts: World War II; European theatre; Battle of the Ruhr; Operation Chastise; Operation Garlic
- Awards: Distinguished Service Order & Bar; Distinguished Flying Cross & Bar
- Other work: Business executive

David John Shannon, DSO & Bar, DFC & Bar (27 May 1922 – 8 April 1993) was an Australian bomber pilot of World War II, known for his part in the "Dambusters" raid on the night of 16/17 May 1943. Born in South Australia, Shannon joined the Royal Australian Air Force (RAAF) in 1941 and learned to fly under the Empire Air Training Scheme. After further training in the United Kingdom he was posted to No. 106 Squadron RAF, operating Avro Lancaster heavy bombers, and was awarded the Distinguished Flying Cross (DFC) in January 1943.

In March 1943, Shannon was selected by No. 106 Squadron's commanding officer, Wing Commander Guy Gibson, to join the newly formed No. 617 Squadron for Operation Chastise, the attack on the dams of the Ruhr valley. Awarded the Distinguished Service Order (DSO) following the raid, Shannon continued to fly with No. 617 Squadron until October 1944, during which time he earned bars to his DSO and DFC. He was then assigned to transport duties, first with No. 511 Squadron and then, in March 1945, with No. 246 Squadron. Ranked squadron leader, Shannon was demobilised after the war and remained in England, becoming an executive with Shell. He died in South London in 1993, aged seventy.

== Early life ==
The son of Howard Huntley Shannon and Phoebe Madeline (née Watson), David John Shannon was born on 27 May 1922 at Unley Park, South Australia. His father was an auctioneer who went on to serve as a South Australian state parliamentarian from 1933 to 1968; his grandfather, John Wallace Shannon, had been a state parliamentarian from 1896 to 1902, and a Federal senator from 1914 to 1920. Shannon attended Unley High School, where he gained his Leaving Certificate. He was working for an insurance company when he joined the Royal Australian Air Force (RAAF) Reserve in Adelaide on 5 July 1940, aged eighteen. On 4 January 1941 he transferred to the RAAF as an air cadet under the Empire Air Training Scheme. He received his instruction in Western Australia at No. 5 Initial Training School in Pearce, No. 9 Elementary Flying Training School in Cunderdin, and No. 4 Service Flying Training School in Geraldton. Following graduation as a pilot officer in September 1941, he was posted to the United Kingdom.

== Active service ==
Promoted to flying officer in March 1942, Shannon underwent conversion to Armstrong Whitworth Whitley bombers at No. 19 Operational Training Unit in Kinloss, Scotland. He was then posted to No. 106 Squadron RAF, operating Avro Lancasters, and flew the first of his thirty-six sorties over Occupied Europe with the unit in June. On at least four occasions his aircraft was struck by flak. He was awarded the Distinguished Flying Cross on 12 January 1943 for "attacks on industrial targets in enemy territory". In March he was selected by No. 106 Squadron's former commanding officer, Wing Commander Guy Gibson, to join the newly formed No. 617 Squadron for Operation Chastise, the "Dambusters" raid on the dams of the Ruhr valley. Shannon was one of four Australian pilots in the squadron—the others being "Micky" Martin, Robert Barlow, and Les Knight—and, at twenty, the youngest captain from among all the crews. He cultivated a moustache in an attempt to add maturity to his baby face.

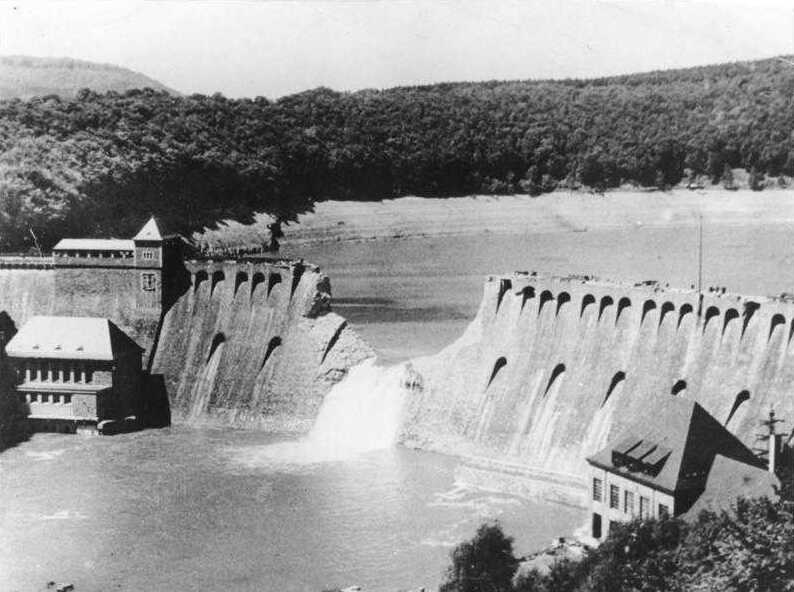
The Eder Dam on 17 May 1943, after it was breached by No. 617 Squadron

On the night of Operation Chastise, 16/17 May 1943, Shannon was among a group of Lancasters led by Gibson in assaults on the Möhne and Eder Dams. After five of the aircraft had dropped their bouncing bombs on the Möhne, Shannon was preparing to make his attack on the dam when it gave way, so he carried on to the Eder with Gibson and three other Lancasters, captained by "Dinghy" Young, Henry Maudsley, and Les Knight. Detailed for the first bombing run at the Eder, Shannon took several attempts to familiarise himself with the area and line up his aircraft, so in the meantime Gibson ordered Maudsley to make his attack. Shannon went in next, delivering his bomb on target. Knight then dropped his bomb, and the dam broke.

Shannon landed back at RAF Scampton feeling "terribly elated". His bomb was believed to have caused a crack in the dam's wall, while Knight's completed the breach. Speaking later of the severe losses suffered by the squadron—eight out of nineteen planes—Shannon contended, "I suppose we had become hardened to loss—we could shrug it off. We had to, otherwise we could never have flown again." He was awarded the Distinguished Service Order for his part in the mission, one of several decorations awarded to the aircrew of No. 617 Squadron for the dams raid and promulgated in The London Gazette with the citation:

On the night of 16th May, 1943, a force of Lancaster bombers was detailed to attack the Moehne, Eder and Sorpe dams in Germany. The operation was one of great difficulty and hazard, demanding a high degree of skill and courage and close co-operation between the crews of the aircraft engaged. Nevertheless, a telling blow was struck at the enemy by the successful breaching of the Mohne and Eder dams. This outstanding success reflects the greatest credit on the efforts of the following personnel who participated in the operation in various capacities as members of aircraft crew.

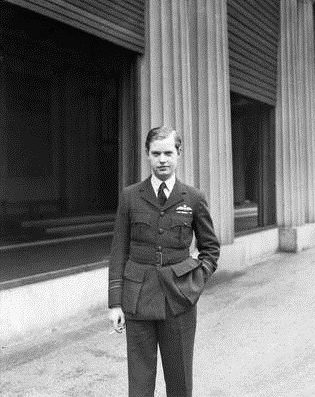
Shannon at Buckingham Palace for an investiture in March 1945

No. 617 Squadron remained active as a special-duties unit operating against high-value targets, and Shannon took part in attacks on the Dortmund-Ems Canal and V-weapon sites with 12,000 lb (5,400 kg) bombs in the second half of 1943. The squadron made two attempts to destroy Dortmund-Ems, the first on the night of 14/15 September, aborting the mission with the loss of a Lancaster piloted by David Maltby. On the second operation the following night, in which five out of eight aircraft were shot down, Shannon hit the target in spite of poor weather, causing some damage. He married Section Officer Ann Fowler of the Women's Auxiliary Air Force at St Mark's parish church in London on 21 September. The couple had met at Scampton before the dams raid; Shannon proposed after returning from the mission and Ann accepted on the condition that he first shave his moustache. He was promoted to flight lieutenant two days later, and awarded a bar to his DFC on 12 November for a "low level attack in adverse weather against heavy opposition".

Shannon again participated in raids against V-weapon sites in January 1944. The following month, No. 617 Squadron undertook its first sortie under the leadership of Wing Commander Leonard Cheshire. The unit began flying low-level target-marking missions using de Havilland Mosquito light bombers as well as Lancasters. Shannon converted to the Mosquito and started flying it operationally in April. He returned to the Lancaster on 5 June to drop "Window" as a part of the Allies' diversions ahead of the D-Day landings the following day, before again flying Mosquitos against V-weapon sites and in support of the Normandy invasion forces.

Though "outwardly nerveless", according to military historian Patrick Bishop, Shannon was not immune to dread feelings. As they prepared to depart on one of their night missions, Cheshire commented on the beautiful sunset, to which Shannon replied, "I don't give a fuck about that, I want to see the sunrise". Having been raised to acting squadron leader, he was awarded a bar to his DSO on 26 September 1944 for "courage of high order on numerous sorties". The full citation in The London Gazette read:

Since the award of a bar to the Distinguished Flying Cross, Squadron Leader Shannon has completed many sorties which he has executed with outstanding resolution and success. He has at all times displayed courage and fortitude of a high order and his appreciation of the responsibilities entrusted to him have set a fine example to all.

In October 1944, after sixty-nine sorties, Shannon was taken off bomber operations and transferred to transport duties, initially with No. 511 Squadron, which flew long-range missions with Avro Yorks. His promotion to squadron leader became substantive on 1 January 1945. Three months later he was assigned to No. 246 Squadron, which operated Yorks and Consolidated Liberators.

== Later life ==
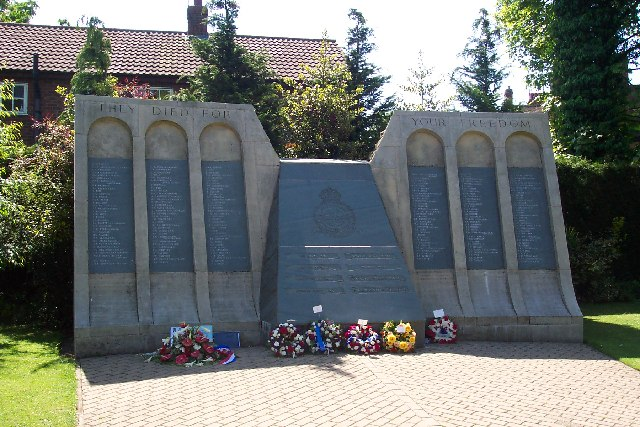
Dam Busters memorial at Woodhall Spa

Shannon was discharged from the RAAF as a squadron leader on 15 December 1945. He stayed in England and joined Shell, taking part in its drilling operations in Asia, Africa and South America. Having been employed as a trainee, he had gained promotion to refining coordinator with the company's East African subsidiary by the time he resigned in September 1961 to farm in Suffolk. Seven years later he joined Offshore Marine, a Trafalgar House company, taking over as managing director in November 1973. He became managing director of Geoprosco Overseas in 1978, and retired in September 1984. Shannon no longer flew after the war, but did like to drive fast cars. He also served as chairman of the No. 617 Squadron Association, helping to raise funds for the Dambusters memorial at Woodhall Spa. His wife Ann died in 1990, and he married artist Eyke Taylor in a civil ceremony at Camberwell, London, on 19 July 1991. On 8 April 1993, shortly before a planned fiftieth anniversary reunion of surviving Dambusters, Shannon died at Denmark Hill, London, following a stroke, and was buried beside Ann at Clifton Hampden, Oxfordshire. The last of the nine pilots who took part in the first wave of the dams raid, he was survived by his second wife and his daughter by Ann.

On 17 May 2008, the sixty-fifth anniversary of the Dambusters raid, a memorial to Shannon and two other South Australians who took part in the mission, bomb aimers Fred Spafford and Bob Hay, was unveiled in Adelaide in the presence of the airmen's families. In July 2009 Shannon's daughter Nikki made his medals, uniform, and logbook available to the Australian War Memorial (AWM) in Canberra, for long-term display. The AWM also holds Shannon's portrait by Sir William Dargie. Shannon is further commemorated by a street in Glenelg North, South Australia.
