= David Maltby =

English bomber pilot (1920–1943)

Squadron Leader David Maltby DSO DFC
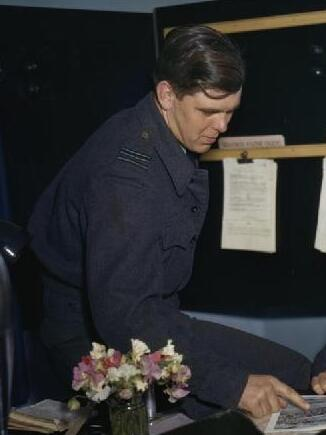
- Maltby in 1943
- Born: 10 May 1920; Baldslow, Sussex
- Died: 15 September 1943 (aged 23) †; North Sea
- Burial place: St Andrew's Church, Wickhambreaux, Kent
- Relatives: Eric Hatfeild (uncle); Brough Maltby (great-grandfather)
- Military career
- Allegiance: United Kingdom
- Branch: Royal Air Force
- Service years: 1940–1943
- Rank: Squadron Leader
- Service number: 60335
- Units: No. 106 Squadron RAF; No. 97 Squadron RAF; No. 617 Squadron RAF
- Conflicts: Second World War: European air campaign; Operation Chastise; Operation Garlic †
- Awards: Distinguished Service Order; Distinguished Flying Cross

Squadron Leader David John Hatfeild Maltby, DSO, DFC (10 May 1920 – 15 September 1943) was a bomber pilot in the Royal Air Force, best known for his part as the pilot of Lancaster AJ-J (“Johnny”) in the Dambusters raid. He had participated in over 30 operations before his death in September 1943.

== Early life ==
Maltby was born on 10 May 1920 in Baldslow, outside Hastings, Sussex. His father, Ettrick, was a headmaster at Hydneye House School which Maltby attended for a while. His mother was Aileen Hatfeild, who was originally from Hartsdown in Kent. He then joined Marlborough College between 1934 and 1936. In 1938 he began training as a mining engineer in Treeton, Yorkshire, but resigned at the outbreak of war. He volunteered to join the Royal Air Force (RAF) in 1939, however, like thousands of others joining, he was told to wait and that he would be invited back for an assessment as soon as possible. He was eventually called up on 20 March 1940 where he was accepted for aircrew training and formally joined the RAF Reserves.

Maltby's maternal uncle was the First World War Royal Flying Corps pilot Aubrey Hatfeild MBE. His great-grandfather was Brough Maltby, the Archdeacon of Nottingham.

== RAF career ==
=== Training ===
Maltby started training at the RAF receiving unit in Uxbridge on Thursday 20 June. After spending some time in the Initial training wing, he attended the Elementary Flying Training School at Ansty in Warwickshire. Here, he trained in an old training aircraft known as the "Tiger Moth". After this, he was sent to No 12 Service Flying Training School at RAF Grantham. He qualified as a pilot on 18 January 1941.

=== Operational career ===
Maltby began his operational career with No. 106 Squadron RAF in June 1941, flying the Handley Page Hampden on five operations. By the end of the month he was transferred to 97 Squadron, flying first Hampdens, then Avro Manchesters and finally Avro Lancasters.

Maltby also participated in initial efforts to sink the infamous German battleship Tirpitz while it was stationed in the Trondheim fjord, flying on “Operation Trondheim” in April 1942.

On 4 May 1942 whilst on a mission to Stuttgart, Maltby and his crew had taken heavy fire shortly after hitting enemy coast. They were carrying a large bomb load and due to the damage they had sustained they were unable to open the bomb doors to jettison the bombs. As well as this, the landing gears could not be properly deployed as they would not lock in place. Maltby made the decision to head back to base at Woodhall Spa but was directed to land at Coningsby instead due to it being a grass runway. Sgt Harold Rouse, who was at the time a gunner on Maltby's crew recalls the incident:

We touched down onto the grass, we bounced, bounced once again but just couldn’t slow down enough. The runway finished up near a corner and there was a gun emplacement there, and as we tore along, they all jumped out of the gun emplacement. We crossed over one road, a field, another road and then into another field, and finally ended up with our nose against a tree. Fortunately, as no front gunner was allowed in the front turret during landing, I’d already got out from there – just as well, because my front turret was absolutely mangled.

All crew miraculously were unscathed after the incident.

He went on to complete his tour in June 1942, and was awarded the Distinguished Flying Cross on 11 August 1942.

Maltby then spent six months commanding an Air Bomber Training Section in No. 1485 Target Towing and Gunnery Flight, before returning to active service with 97 Squadron in March 1943. He was given a new crew, most of whom had only just finished training. On 25 March 1943, he and his crew were transferred to 617 Squadron, along with Flt Lt Joe McCarthy and Flt Lt Les Munro and their crews.

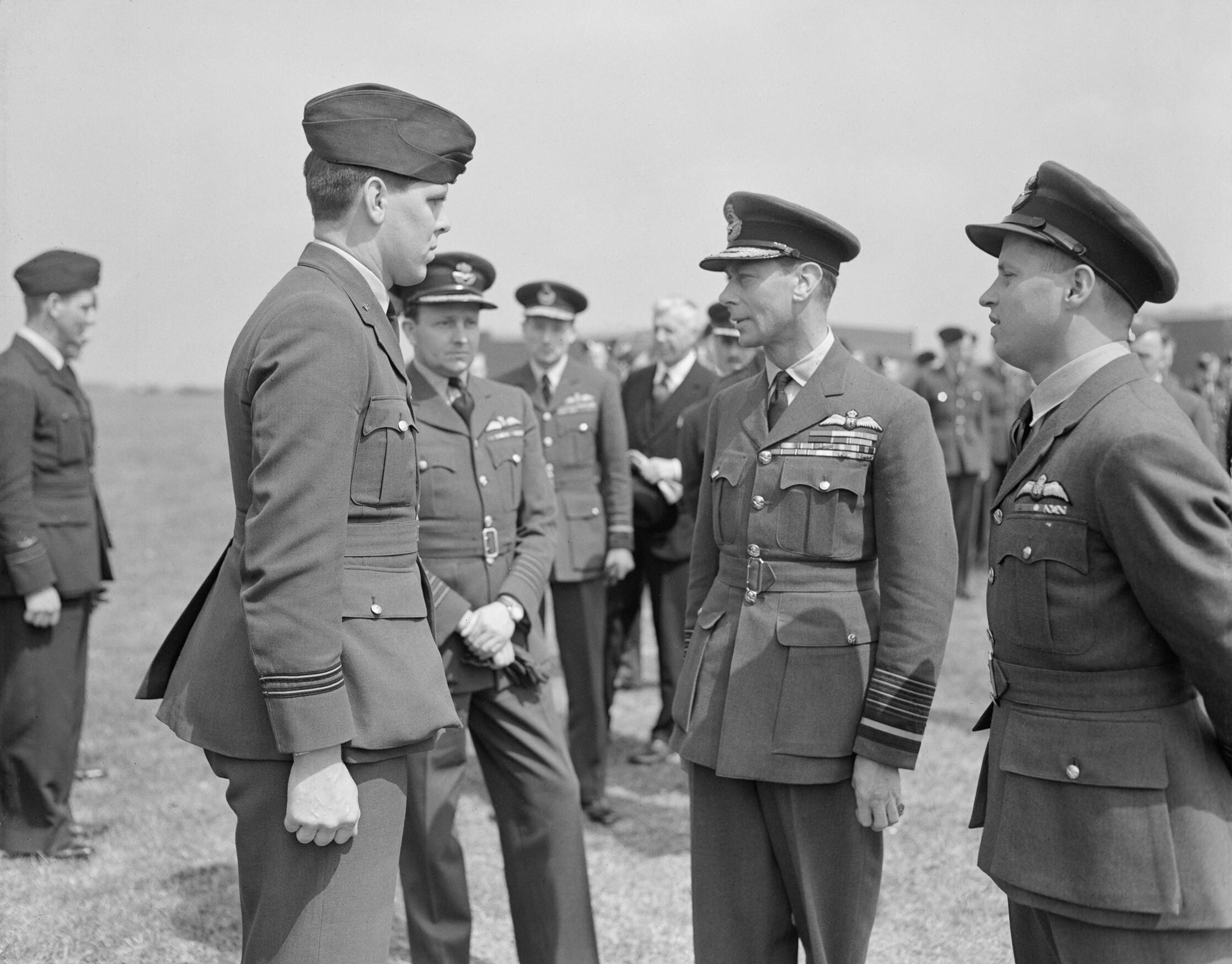
King George VI, with Wing Commander Guy Gibson (right), addressing Maltby (left) following the Dams raid.

=== Operation Chastise ===
Maltby flew in the No. 617 Squadron RAF Operation Chastise dams raid of 1943. He was the pilot of Avro Lancaster J-Johnny, flying as part of the first wave that attacked the Möhne Dam. The first three aircraft to attack the dam (Guy Gibson flying in G-George, Hopgood in M-Mother and Harold Brownlow Martin in P-Popsie) all missed the target. The next, A-Apple (flown by Dinghy Young) hit the dam and caused a small breach but, as this was not apparent from the air, J-Johnny also attacked, scored a hit and a large breach. Maltby then returned home and was the first Lancaster to land back at Scampton having completed the operation.

For his part in Operation Chastise, Maltby was awarded a Distinguished Service Order. He was shortly after promoted to Squadron Leader and appointed as A flight commander of No. 617 Squadron.

Gibson sent Maltby a telegraph (which has been recorded in the IBCC digital archives) on the 24th May congratulating him on his DSO award. The telegram reads:

Heartiest congratulations on award of DSO - Wingco

A similar telegram is also sent by Air Marshall Arthur Harris congratulating Maltby.

During Gibson's leave from June until August Maltby became the acting commanding officer for 617 squadron until George Holden was appointed as the new permanent replacement for Gibson.

== Death ==
Maltby was killed a few months after the dams raid during Operation Garlic, a failed attempt at a low-level raid on the Dortmund-Ems Canal. His Lancaster JA981 crashed into the North Sea while returning to base after the mission had been cancelled due to fog over the target. It is probable that the cause of his death was a collision with a 139 Squadron Mosquito aircraft (DZ598) piloted by Flt Lt M W Colledge and navigator Flg Off G L Marshall, who were returning from an operation to Berlin, and was on a course for RAF Wyton, Cambridgeshire. It was northeast of Cromer when it intersected Maltby's course to RAF Coningsby. Dave Shannon, a fellow dambuster, circled the crash site for two hours whilst waiting for rescue. Maltby's body was the only one recovered and he was buried in the churchyard of St Andrew's Church, Wickhambreaux, Kent.

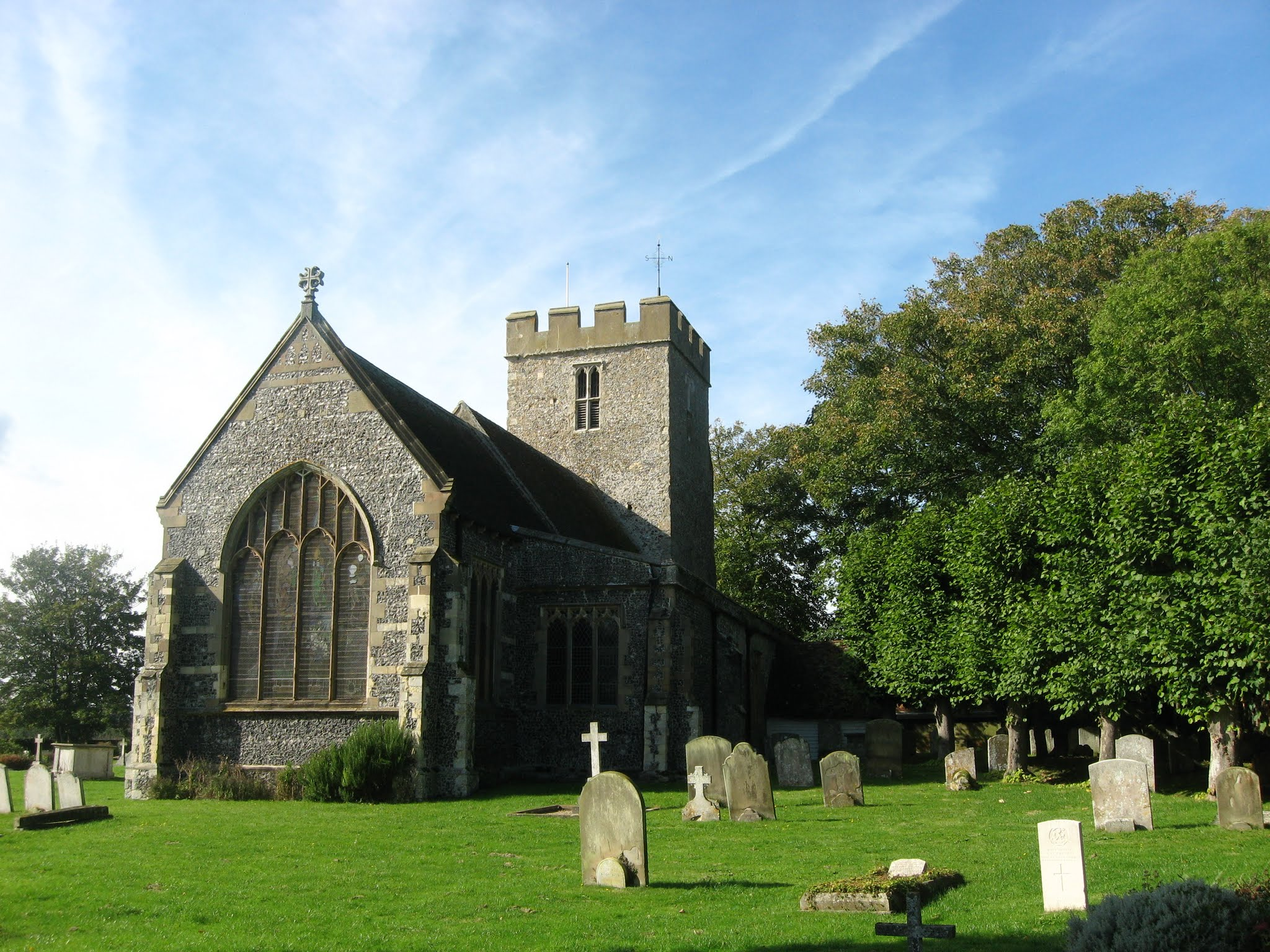
Wickhambreaux, Kent, The Church of St. Andrew where there is a gravestone in memory of Maltby & his crew

== Post-war ==
=== Popular culture ===
In the 1955 film The Dam Busters, Maltby was played by George Baker. Baker stated in an interview that he was chosen for the part due to his physical similarity to Maltby.

The detailed story of Maltby and his crew is documented in the book Breaking the Dams: The Story of Dambuster David Maltby and His Crew written by Charles Foster.

=== Memorabilia ===
A bombsight that was used by Maltby's crew on Operation Chastise is said to have been passed initially onto Maltby's father Ettrick shortly after the dams raid. It remained at Hydneye House school until its demolition, ending up in the possession of a former pupil, who sold it at auction in 2015 for over £41,000. It was however later speculated by fellow dambuster Johnny Johnson in an interview that such bombsights were fiction and didn't exist as far as he was aware, and that Maltby's was likely an educational fabrication by his father Ettrick to display in his school where he was headmaster.

Several other pieces of memorabilia related to Maltby have appeared in recent years, however many of these have been subject to critique and doubt over their legitimacy. In November 2019 a teddy bear named "Pinnie The Wooh", said to have flown with Maltby on every flight, was revealed to be going up for auction in Bristol later that month by an unknown seller. The Maltby family later released a statement that they were unable to provide the authenticity for this item along with others that have been rumoured to be up for sale. Others have pointed out that the bear is in remarkably good condition considering it was recovered from Maltby's body which was found in the North Sea.

Another piece of memorabilia allegedly passed on to Maltby's father's collection at his school was a pair of marbles that Barnes Wallace used to test his original theory behind the bouncing bomb. The marbles went up for auction in September 2024 and sold for £15,200. Once again, no authentication for the marbles were provided.

The Maltby family have stated that personal items of David, where known to them, have been retained as they care for them deeply and have never considered profiteering from them.

Maltby's log book is still in existence and is available for online access on the IBCC archive website.
