= Denys Graham =

Welsh actor (1926–2024)

- Born: 29 June 1926; Newport, Monmouthshire, Wales
- Died: 24 October 2024 (aged 98)
- Occupation: Actor

Denys Graham (29 June 1926 – 24 October 2024) was a Welsh actor who appeared in the later series of Rumpole of the Bailey as the title character's many-daughtered colleague Percy Hoskins. Over a 70-year career he played a wide range of other roles on stage and screen.

== Life and career ==
Graham was born in Newport, Monmouthshire, Wales on 29 June 1926. An accomplished pianist, he was educated at New College, Oxford and trained at the Royal Academy of Dramatic Art.

His extensive and varied theatre work included playing in the original 1956 production of Under Milk Wood at the New Theatre, London and appearing in the original 1955 production of Waiting for Godot at the Arts Theatre, London, directed by Peter Hall. For two years he was a member of John Gielgud’s company at the Phoenix Theatre, London, followed by a season with the Royal Shakespeare Company at Stratford-upon-Avon. His final West End role was Victor Witt in Grand Hotel at the Dominion Theatre in 1992.

Graham's best known film roles were Flying Officer L.G. Knight DSO in The Dam Busters (1955), Private Fraser in Dunkirk (1958), Private 716 Robert Jones in Zulu (1964) and Kaiser Wilhelm II in All Quiet on the Western Front (1979).

Graham died on 24 October 2024, at the age of 98.

== Filmography ==
Year	Title	Role	Notes
1953	Valley of Song	Denzil – Miner	uncredited
1955	The Dam Busters	Flying Officer L. G. Knight, D.S.O.	
1956	Fire Maidens from Outer Space	scientist	uncredited
1958	Dunkirk	Fraser	
1964	Zulu	Private 716 Robert Jones	
1966	Modesty Blaise	Co-Pilot	
1979	All Quiet on the Western Front	Kaiser Wilhelm II	
