= Guy Gibson =

Recipient of the Victoria Cross (1918–1944)

Wing Commander Guy Gibson VC DSO & Bar DFC & Bar
- Wing Commander Guy Gibson in 1944
- Born: 12 August 1918; Simla, British India
- Died: 19 September 1944 (aged 26); Steenbergen, Netherlands
- Military career
- Allegiance: United Kingdom
- Branch: Royal Air Force
- Service years: 1936–1944
- Rank: Wing Commander
- Service number: 39438
- Units: No. 83 (Bomber) Squadron; No. 29 Squadron
- Commands: No. 106 Squadron (1942-43); No. 617 Squadron (1943)
- Conflicts: Second World War: European air campaign †; Operation Chastise
- Awards: Victoria Cross; Distinguished Service Order & Bar; Distinguished Flying Cross & Bar; Commander of the Legion of Merit (United States)

Wing Commander Guy Penrose Gibson, VC, DSO & Bar, DFC & Bar (12 August 1918 – 19 September 1944) was a British bomber pilot in the Royal Air Force during the Second World War. He was the first commanding officer of No. 617 Squadron, which he led in the "Dam Busters" raid in 1943, resulting in the breaching of two large dams in the Ruhr area of Germany. He was awarded the Victoria Cross, the highest award for gallantry in the face of the enemy that can be awarded to British and Commonwealth forces, in the aftermath of the raid in May 1943 and became the most highly decorated British serviceman at that time. He completed over 170 war operations before being killed in action at the age of 26.

== Early life and education ==
Gibson was born in Simla, British India, on 12 August 1918, the son of Alexander James Gibson and his wife Leonora (Nora) Mary Gibson. At the time of Gibson's birth, his father was an officer in the Imperial Indian Forestry Service, becoming the Chief Conservator of Forests for the Simla Hill States in 1922. In 1924, when he was six, his parents separated. His mother was granted custody of Gibson, his elder brother Alexander ("Alick") and sister Joan, and decided to return to England.

As her family came from Porthleven, Cornwall, Nora Gibson settled first in Penzance. Gibson started school in Cornwall at the same school as his sister, West Cornwall College. His mother then moved to London and he was sent as a boarder to Earl's Avenue School, a preparatory school, later known as St George's, in Folkestone, Kent.

In 1932 Gibson started at St Edward's School, Oxford, the same school as Douglas Bader where he was also placed in the same house, Cowell's. Gibson's housemaster was A. F. "Freddie" Yorke who became Gibson's guardian.

Following her return from India, Gibson's mother developed a drinking problem which escalated into alcoholism. Her behaviour became increasingly erratic and sometimes violent towards her children. The school organised lodgings for Gibson and his brother during the school holidays. Nora's younger sister, Mrs Beatrice ("Gwennie") Christopher, gave Gibson his own room at her house. Her husband, John, helped Nora out with school fees. They also both attended some school functions to support their nephews.

Gibson was an average student academically and played for the Rugby Second XV. His interests included science and photography. At one stage as a teenager, he seems to have become interested and quite expert in the workings of cinema organs. He read all kinds of books, especially the Arthurian legends and Shakespeare. His favourite play was Henry V. He was made a house prefect.

From an early age Gibson wanted to fly. He had a picture of his boyhood hero, Albert Ball VC, the First World War flying ace, on his bedroom wall at his aunt's house. His ambition was to become a civilian test pilot. He wrote for advice to Vickers, receiving a reply from their chief test pilot, Captain Joseph "Mutt" Summers, who wrote that Gibson should first learn to fly by joining the RAF on a short service commission. Gibson applied to the RAF, but was rejected when he failed the Medical Board; the probable reason that his legs were too short. His later application was successful, and his personal file included the remark "satisfactory leg length test carried out". He commenced a short service commission in November 1936.

== Initial military service ==
=== Initial military training ===
Gibson commenced his flying training on 16 November 1936 at the Bristol Flying School, Yatesbury, with No. 6 Flying Training Course and with civilian instructors. Owing to poor weather the course did not conclude until 1 January 1937. After some leave, he then moved to No. 24 (Training) Group at RAF Uxbridge for his RAF basic training. He was commissioned with the rank of acting pilot officer with effect from 31 January 1937. He then underwent further flying training as a member of the junior section of No. 5 Flying Training Course at No. 6 Flying Training School RAF, RAF Netheravon. He was awarded his pilot's wings on 24 May 1937.

As part of the Advanced Training Squadron, during summer 1937, he participated in further training at No. 3 Armament Training Station, Sutton Bridge, Lincolnshire. He opted for bombers as these gave experience in multi-engined planes, this being typical for individuals planning on a civilian flying career. He returned to Netheravon and graduated on 31 August 1937. He passed all his ground exams first time, with an average of 77.29% and a flying rating of "average". However, his rating as a companion was below average owing to his sometimes rude and condescending behaviour towards junior ranks and ground crews in particular.

=== No. 83 (Bomber) Squadron ===
Gibson's initial posting was to No. 83 (Bomber) Squadron, stationed at RAF Turnhouse, west of Edinburgh. He was assigned to 'A' Flight and was placed under the supervision of Pilot Officer Anthony "Oscar" Bridgman. The squadron was flying Hawker Hinds. He joined a settled group of officers from similar minor public school backgrounds. As some stayed with the squadron for a few years, promotion was slow. He was promoted to pilot officer on 16 November 1937. His behaviour towards the ground crews continued to be perceived as unsatisfactory and they gave him the nickname the "Bumptious Bastard".

In March 1938, the squadron was transferred from No. 2 Group to No. 5 Group and relocated to RAF Scampton. In June they moved to RAF Leuchars for an armaments training camp. From October the squadron started their conversion to the Handley Page Hampden, which was completed by January 1939. At a Court of Inquiry in October 1938, Gibson was found guilty of negligence after a taxiing incident at RAF Hemswell. He spent Christmas Day 1938 in hospital at RAF Rauceby with chickenpox. He was then sent on convalescent leave, returning to the squadron in late January.

In Spring 1939 the squadron took part in an armaments training camp at RAF Evanton near Invergordon in Scotland. With the likelihood of war increasing and as part of a plan to improve standards, Gibson was sent on a navigation course at Hamble near Southampton. He did not appear to take the course seriously, but passed with an average mark. The instructor added the comment "could do well". He was due to leave the RAF, but was retained owing to the outbreak of hostilities in Abyssinia. In June he was promoted to flying officer. On 25 July the squadron made a long-distance flight to the south of France. They participated in Home Defence exercises over London in August. He then went on his summer leave. At this stage of his career, he had never flown or landed a plane at night.

== Second World War ==
=== First operational tour: No. 83 Squadron, Bomber Command ===
Gibson was recalled from leave back to Scampton by telegram on 31 August 1939. Gibson's first wartime flight was on 3 September 1939, the day the United Kingdom entered Second World War. He was one of the pilots selected to attack the German fleet, which was near Wilhelmshaven. He took off at 18:15. The operation was aborted owing to bad weather and he landed back at Scampton around 23:00. On 5 September while in the Mess, he was bitten by a dog. His arm was put in a sling and he was granted 36 hours leave. This allowed him to attend his brother's wedding in Rugby, where he was Alick's best man. On his return, the squadron had moved to Ringway near Manchester under the Scatter Scheme. They were there for 10 days. The squadron did not fly on another operation until December; this period of inactivity became known as the Phoney War.

In February 1940, Gibson was one of the members of the squadron put on temporary secondment to Coastal Command at RAF Lossiemouth. On 27 February, he participated in an operation that was sent to attack a U-boat. However, owing to various communications problems, one of the aircraft dropped its bombs on a Royal Navy submarine. The senior officers involved with the incident were censured for their failure to bring the squadron up to a satisfactory standard. The squadron then underwent a period of intensive training.

The period from April to September 1940 was one of the most operationally intense periods of Gibson's career. He completed 34 operations in 5 months, with 10 in June. The type of operation varied from "gardening" – laying mines in various seaways and harbour entrances – to attacks on capital ships, as well as attacks on ground-based military and economic targets. During this time, he acquired a reputation for being seemingly fearless, particularly as he was willing to fly in marginal weather. He was awarded the Distinguished Flying Cross (DFC) on 9 July 1940. He was trained for a low-level attack on the Dortmund-Ems canal, but he missed the actual raid on 12 August. On his return from a raid on Lorient on 27 August, he spotted a Dornier Do 215 and attacked it. He was credited with a "probable" kill. He was promoted to flight lieutenant on 3 September 1940. His last operation with the squadron was to Berlin on 23 September 1940. Arthur Harris, then the Air Officer Commanding (AOC) No. 5 Group, later described Gibson as the "most full-out fighting pilot" under his command at this time.

As was usual practice, to give pilots a rest from operations, Gibson was posted as a flying instructor to No. 14 Operational Training Unit (OTU) at RAF Cottesmore. He was there for two weeks, part of which was spent on leave, but he did not settle. He was then transferred to No. 16 OTU at RAF Upper Heyford. Meanwhile, Air Marshal Sholto Douglas, Deputy Chief of the Air Staff, and Air Vice Marshal Trafford Leigh-Mallory, AOC No. 12 (Fighter) Group, made an appeal to Harris for bomber pilots with their night-flying experience to fly night fighters. Gibson volunteered. Harris wrote a letter introducing the pilots, which included the comment "a hand-picked bunch of which Gibson is the best". Harris agreed to help Gibson's career when he had completed this tour with "the best command within my power".

=== Second operational tour: No. 29 Squadron, Fighter Command ===
Gibson was ordered to report on 13 November 1940 to No. 29 Squadron as the commander of 'A' Flight. The squadron was stationed at RAF Digby in Lincolnshire, but flew from a small satellite field at RAF Wellingore about six miles away. The officers' mess was nearby in The Grange. When he arrived, the Commanding Officer, Squadron Leader Charles Widdows, was in the process of rebuilding the squadron following an outbreak of indiscipline that nearly led to its disbandment during July 1940. He was weeding out under-performing pilots and replacing his flight commanders. Gibson attracted some hostility from some longer-standing members of the squadron, because as one of these new flight commanders, he was seen as part of Widdows' reforms and he had been chosen over an existing member of the squadron. He had also come from a Bomber squadron. The root cause of the low morale was a lack of combat success. The Bristol Blenheim was not designed as a night fighter and the aircraft interception (AI) radar was still in its very early days of development. Also, Widdows was required to split the squadron up with a few pilots each at Ternhill, Kirton and Wittering and with no more than half at Digby at any one time. Gibson flew six operations in Blenheims.

The squadron started to convert to the Bristol Beaufighter I and Widdows personally supervised his pilots during their conversion. Gibson's first flight in a Beaufighter was on 1 December 1940. He then undertook some intensive training on AI radar procedure. He found the night-fighter culture very different from bombers as the two-man crew had to work as a team with the pilot relying on the guidance of the AI operator to find their targets. Gibson made his first operational flight in a Beaufighter on 10 December with Sergeant Taylor as his AI operator. That winter saw bad weather and he flew only three operations in the whole of January. He claimed a kill on 12 March, but it was not confirmed. However, his kill on 14 March was confirmed as a Heinkel He 111. He went to Skegness to collect the tail assembly as trophy for the squadron and the crew's dinghy for himself. He was attacked by an intruder German aircraft when landing at Wellingore on 8 April. Gibson was unharmed, but his AI operator, Sergeant Bell, was injured in the leg.

In April, Widdows obtained a transfer for the squadron from 12 to 11 Group and a move to RAF West Malling in Kent. Gibson flew down with him on 25 April to inspect the facilities. The full squadron flew down on 29 April. Gibson was promoted to acting squadron leader towards the end of June 1941 and started to deputise for the commander in his absence. Widdows was promoted to station command and was replaced by Wing Commander Edward Colbeck-Welch. Gibson claimed two more kills which were confirmed. Another unidentified bomber, possibly a Heinkel, was claimed in flames on 3/4 May. On 6 July he downed a Heinkel He 111H-5 of 8/KG4 near Sheerness. His AI radar operator on all his successful claims was Sergeant R.H. James, who was awarded a Distinguished Flying Medal. However, the Luftwaffe's bombing offensive was tailing off and Gibson started to become bored by the relative safety, and began to describe patrols as "stooge patrols" in his log book. He made some further interceptions but his guns or cannons failed. He was also concerned by his relative lack of success compared with his fellow flight commander Bob Braham. He seems to have been happy at West Malling and said "Of all the airfields in Great Britain, here, many say, including myself, we have the most pleasant". His final patrols with the squadron were flown on 15 December. He left with both flying and gunnery ratings of above average. He was awarded a Bar to his DFC.

Again, as a rest from operations, Gibson was due to be posted to an OTU, this time No. 51 OTU, RAF Cranfield as Chief Flying Instructor. By now he had decided he wanted to return to bombers. Despite a visit to HQ No. 5 Group on 15 December to petition for a transfer, Fighter Command insisted he had to go to Cranfield. His opportunity came a few weeks later when on 22 February 1942, Arthur Harris was appointed Air Officer Commanding-in-Chief (AOC-in-C) of Bomber Command. Harris fulfilled his promise made in September 1940. He called Gibson for an interview. On 22 March, Harris wrote to Air Vice Marshal John Slessor, AOC No. 5 Group, explaining his intention to promote Gibson to acting wing commander to put him in command of a Lancaster squadron. Harris suggested No. 207 Squadron. Slessor exercised his discretion and appointed Gibson CO of No. 106 Squadron. Gibson was posted from No. 51 OTU and sent on leave until April, which he spent in south Wales.

=== Third operational tour: No. 106 Squadron, Bomber Command ===
When the newly promoted Wing Commander Gibson, aged just 23, joined No. 106 Squadron at RAF Coningsby, morale was good, but there was serious disappointment with the new twin-engined Avro Manchester because its Rolls-Royce Vulture engines were unreliable. Therefore, the squadron was scheduled to convert to the four-engined Avro Lancaster, equipped with Rolls-Royce Merlin engines as soon as they became available.

Gibson eased himself back into bomber operational flying with a mine-laying operation in the Baltic on 22 April 1942. and completed three more sorties in the Manchester during the following 3 weeks.

April 1942 was a good month for the squadron. They flew on eighteen nights, six consecutively and the improvements in performance were noted by analysts at both No. 5 Group and Bomber Command. The Lancasters started to arrive during May and an ad hoc training plan was started while normal operations were maintained. Gibson made his first flight in a Lancaster in early May.

As a commander, Gibson's main concern was to be seen to share the risk. He continued to show unremitting aggression with a selectivity towards harder targets rather than easier ones. He expected the same determination from everyone on the squadron. He was ruthless in screening crews for reliability. The station's Medical Officer became expert in determining which crews were simply unlucky in contrast with genuine malingerers. However he was capable of serious misjudgements on occasions, and could be prone to unreasonable outbursts and the persecution of some crews and their members.

Like Widdows, he carefully supervised new crews and eased them into operational flying with "Nasturtium training" – mine-laying and then easier targets. He was pressured to expose them earlier to greater risks, and acquired a reputation for not accepting any interference in how he ran the squadron.

Gibson's exercise of summary discipline tended towards constructive tasks aimed at improving the efficiency of the squadron such as maintenance of aircraft, engines or weapons He was responsible for the emergence of an inner circle of officers who shared his intensity for operations. Their off-duty activities included swimming, water polo and shooting. However, his behaviour towards NCOs and ground crews could still be a problem. Soon after his arrival, the NCOs perceived one incident he was involved in with them as particularly high-handed and the ground crews quickly gave him the nickname "The Boy Emperor". Gibson got on better with his own class and background than with "other ranks and colonials". Bomb-aimer George "Johnny" Johnson of Joe McCarthy's crew said that on 106 Squadron he was known as the 'Arch-Bastard' because of his strict discipline, and he did not mix with the lower ranks or talk to NCOs, ground crews or Canadians. A little man, he was arrogant, bombastic and a strict disciplinarian but "had something to be bombastic about" and was a "true leader ... though he never spoke to or even acknowledged me." In an interview with the RAF Benevolent Fund in 2013 Johnson praised Gibson's leadership qualities on the day of the raid though.

On 11 May, Gibson was hospitalised at RAF Rauceby in Lincolnshire. The exact reason is unknown, but suggestions include a sinus or middle ear problem. He was then sent on two weeks convalescent leave. This absence meant he was unable to participate in Operation Millennium, the "1000 Bomber raids", the first of which was made on Cologne on 30 May 1942. He found this frustrating because this raid saw the introduction of the Bomber stream. This was where the aircraft were concentrated together in an attempt to overwhelm the defences, with each allocated a specific place, height band, and time slot. This period saw the introduction of aiming-point photography. Gibson tried it out and then encouraged all aircrews to become "photo minded". Obtaining good aiming point photographs quickly became a competition both within, and between squadrons.

On his return he continued to build up his experience with the Lancaster. He flew with his friend, pilot John Hopgood on 4 July and then on a long cross-country flight the day after, 5 July. He made his first operational flight in a Lancaster on 8 July with Dave Shannon as his second pilot. They were together again on 11 July when they went to Danzig. They were appalled when they were sent on a daylight bombing raid to the Krupp Arms Works in Essen on 18 July. It was known as a difficult and dangerous target at night, expected to be much worse in the daytime, and they were relieved to be recalled when near Vlissingen. They jettisoned their bombs over the sea before returning.

The squadron was selected for special training in the use of two kinds of new bombsight for use with a special bomb designed for attacks on capital ships. However, Gibson advised that the aircraft should not attack any ships below 8,500 feet. They put this training into practice with a marathon flight to Gdynia on 27 August 1942. The targets were Gneisenau and Scharnhorst. Gibson again flew with Shannon and they swapped places during the flight. There was significant unexpected haze over the target when they arrived. Gibson's bomb aimer, Squadron Leader Richardson, a bombing instructor from RAF Manby, requested twelve practice runs over the target, but they still failed to damage the ship. In fact no ships were damaged during the raid, but the squadron's preparation for the raid was noted by Harris and Air Commodore Alec Coryton, the AOC No. 5 Group.

On 30 September the squadron moved from Coningsby to RAF Syerston in Nottinghamshire. They expected this move to be only temporary while the runways were concreted, but problems at Coningsby meant it became permanent.

Gibson quickly formed a good relationship with Syerston's station commander Group Captain "Gus" Walker. In October, they were required to conduct low-level training exercises with aircraft flying in formations of threes and sixes. This training was put to use in a raid on the 17th on Le Creusot in France. Gibson and Hopgood were among the pilots sent to attack the electric transformer station at nearby Montchanin. Later in the month they started to attack Italian targets including Genoa, Milan and Turin. In November 1942 Gibson was awarded the Distinguished Service Order (DSO).

On 8 December Gibson did not fly. He was in the control room with Walker watching the aircraft taxiing for take-off. Walker noticed some incendiaries which had fallen out of the bomb bay of a reserve Lancaster located near the main bomb dump. The incendiaries had ignited. Walker drove out to the plane and tried to move the incendiaries with a rake. He lost his arm in the subsequent explosion of the 4000 lb "cookie" bomb still in the aircraft's bomb bay. He was replaced by Group Captain Bussell.

On 16 January 1943, Gibson took BBC war correspondent Major Richard Dimbleby on a sortie to Berlin. Dimbleby described the raid in a later radio broadcast. Gibson was very pleased with the outcome, as he always wanted to communicate what life was like for the aircrews. On 12 March, he made his final flight with the squadron to Stuttgart. He flew on three engines and was forced to stay low throughout the raid.

Bussell recommended Gibson for a Bar to his DSO, but this was reduced to a second Bar to his DFC at HQ No. 5 Group owing to the recent award of the DSO. However, Harris confirmed the Bar to Gibson's DSO with the comment "any Captain who completes 172 sorties in outstanding manner is worth two DSOs if not a VC. Bar to DSO approved". Gibson was informed on 25 March, after he left the squadron.

Gibson was expecting to go on leave to Cornwall and was therefore shocked when he received a call from HQ No. 5 Group to inform him he was being posted there to write a book.

== No. 617 Squadron and Operation Chastise ==
=== Formation of Squadron X ===
After the decision was made to attack the Ruhr dams, Harris decided to hand the direct responsibility for the detailed planning, preparation and execution to Air Vice Marshal Ralph Cochrane, AOC No. 5 Group. Harris told him he must form a new squadron and nominated Gibson as the CO.

On 18 March 1943 Gibson attended an interview at HQ No. 5 Group where Cochrane asked him if he was willing to fly on "one more trip". Gibson indicated that he was. He attended a further interview the following day when he was told that he was to command a new squadron, which would be required to fly low at night with an objective that had to be achieved by 19 May. At this meeting, he was introduced to Group Captain John Whitworth, the commander of RAF Scampton where the new squadron was to be stationed.

==== Selection of aircrew ====
A circular was sent by 5 Group to all its squadrons, asking them to provide a pilot and crew for a new squadron, for a special one-off operation. No copies of the circular survive, but it would seem to have specified that the crew should be experienced, even perhaps have completed a full tour. Bomber Command then stated they should have completed or nearly completed two tours of operations.

Squadron Leaders Maudslay and Young were appointed as his flight commanders. The selection of Young resulted in the transfer of the whole of 'C' Flight from No. 57 Squadron into the new one. Some crews or pilots were known to Gibson including Hopgood and Shannon, who by this time had transferred from No. 106 squadron to the Pathfinders and No. 83 Squadron. He selected Harold "Mick" Martin for his low-flying expertise. Of Gibson's regular crew from No. 106 Squadron, only Robert Hutchison, the wireless operator, volunteered for this new one. Three more members of his crew came from 50 Squadron, Harlo Taerum, a Canadian navigator, Fred Spafford, an Australian bomb-aimer, and Richard Trevor-Roper, rear gunner. The front gunner was George Deering, another Canadian, and the flight engineer was John Pulford. Although Gibson's crew comprised experienced men, in the end some crews had not completed one tour, with some individuals having flown fewer than ten operations.

Gibson was strict in screening the crews during training. That not all the crews were known to him is reflected in how two crews were posted off the squadron as not satisfactory and another crew chose to leave after their navigator was deemed unsatisfactory.

=== Training of No. 617 Squadron ===
Gibson arrived at Scampton on 21 March. His office was on the 1st floor in No.2 Hangar. His immediate task was to get the general administration organised. He delegated this and the adjutant assigned from No. 57 Squadron was quickly replaced with Flight Lieutenant Humphreys from Syerston. Humphreys was instrumental in the rapid establishment of the squadron. The ground staff started to muster from 21 March and were fully present by 27 March. Flight Sergeant (Discip) Powell inspected them and weeded out those he felt other squadrons had off-loaded. The aircrews started to arrive from 24 March.

On 24 March Gibson travelled to Burhill near Weybridge for his first meeting with Barnes Wallis. Wallis discovered Gibson had not been cleared for a full briefing and therefore could not be told the targets. Wallis was able to explain the design and operation of the new weapon, Upkeep and showed him films from its trials. It was a depth charge which, if rotated with backspin and dropped at the correct speed and altitude, would bounce across the surface of a body of water towards a target. This bouncing behaviour gave it its nickname the bouncing bomb. The crews usually referred to it as a mine.

On 27 March Group Captain Satterley provided Gibson with "most secret" written orders, including a description of the attack and the general plan for the squadron's preliminary training. From these Gibson learnt that the targets were "lightly defended special targets" which reduced his suspicion that they were training to attack the Tirpitz. The orders included a list of nine lakes and reservoirs in the Midlands and North Wales, for training flights and target practice. They included Eyebrook Reservoir, near Uppingham, Rutland, Abberton Reservoir near Colchester and Derwent Reservoir in the Peak District. Some of the earliest flights made by the new No. 617 Squadron, were reconnaissance flights over these bodies of water. A recommendation to maximize the training time available was to use simulated night flying as developed by the USAAF. This required the cockpit to be covered in blue celluloid and the pilots and bomb aimers to wear goggles with amber-tinted lenses. Gibson wanted six aeroplanes converted but only two became available, the first on 11 April.

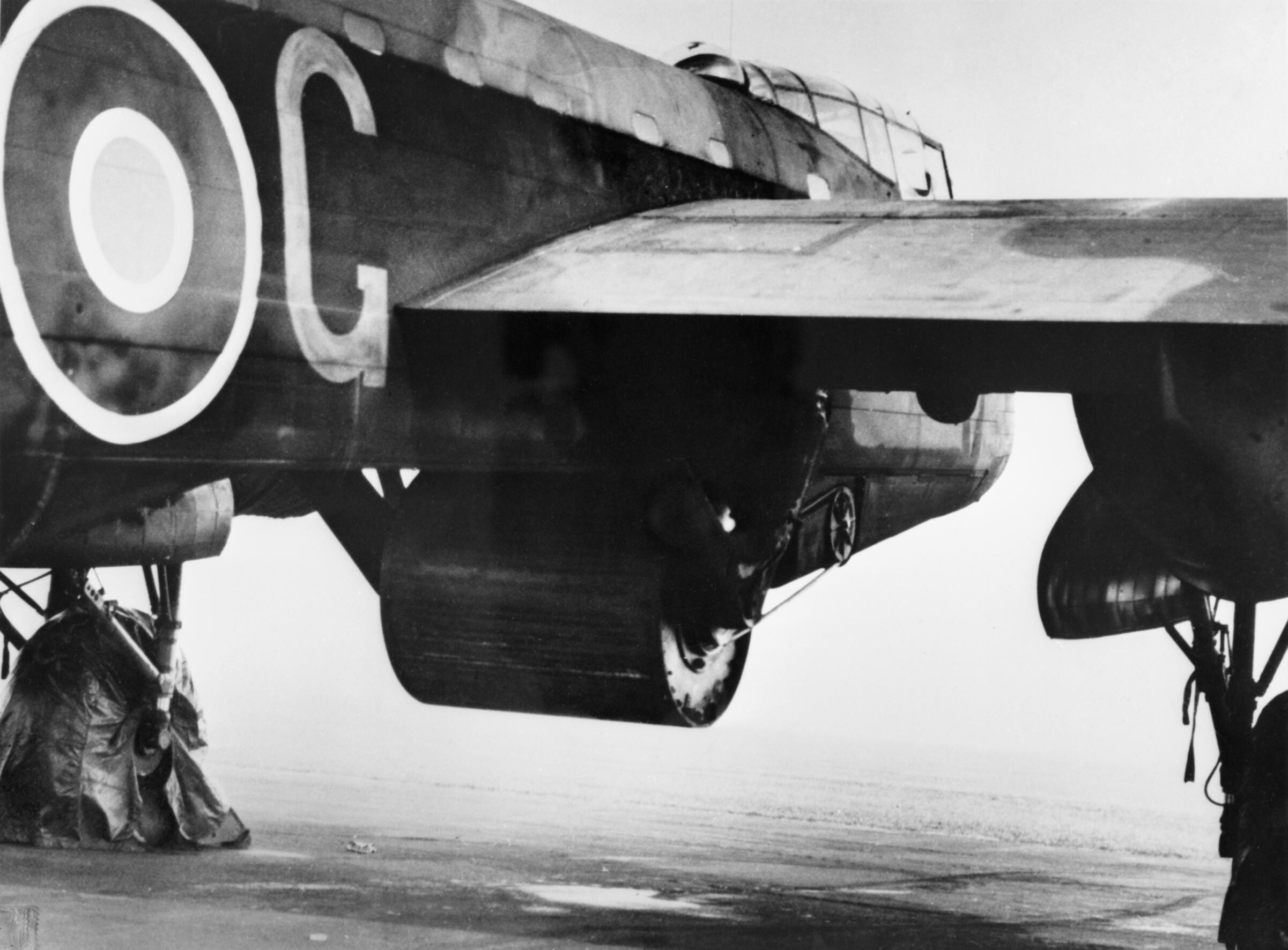
"Upkeep" bouncing bomb used for dam busting bomb mounted under Lancaster B III (Special). The chain was driven by a hydraulic motor and gave the bomb its backspin.

Another important factor was the need for a specially adapted version of the Lancaster, the B.III (Special), officially the "Type 464 (Provisioning)". The bomb bay doors were removed and the ends of the bay were covered with fairings. Upkeep was suspended on pivoted, vee-shaped struts which sprang apart when the bomb-release button was pressed. A drive belt and pulley to rotate the bomb at 500 rpm was mounted on the starboard strut and driven by a hydraulic motor housed in the forward fairing. The mid-upper turret was removed and a more bulbous bomb aimer's blister was fitted. The first adapted aircraft arrived at Scampton on 8 April. Gibson also had VHF radios (normally reserved for fighters) fitted to the Type 464 Lancasters as he intended to control the operation while over the target, an early example of what became the master bomber role.

On 28 March, Gibson made his first flight to explore the low-flying requirement. He took Hopgood and Young with him and found low flying during daylight satisfactory but during an attempt at dusk the difficulty of their task became apparent, when they nearly ditched. On 29 March, Gibson was shown scale models of the Moehne and Sorpe dams by Cochrane at HQ 5 Group. He then attended a further meeting with Wallis at Weybridge. At this meeting he rejected Wallis's proposal of a daylight raid.

The squadron commenced daily flying training at the beginning of April with long cross-country flights with precise turning points to develop their navigation skills. They then started to practise low flying over water. The squadron completed over a thousand flying hours by the end of April and Gibson was able to report to Whitworth, that they could fly pinpoint to pinpoint at low level at night, could bomb using a rangefinder and fly over water at 150 ft (46 m). On 24 April Wallis made a request for the altitude to be reduced to 60 ft (18 m). Gibson reported on 27 April that it was possible and the training was adapted accordingly.

Gibson was closely involved with discussions about the design, trial and approval of the solutions developed for the various technical issues encountered. These included the Dann bomb sight and the 'Spotlight Altimeter Calibrator', which was the name given to the spotlights attached to the Lancasters, to ensure the determination of the correct height above a body of water. Security was Gibson's constant concern and he was especially displeased to learn from his bombing leader Watson that he had been shown details of the targets within days of his arrival at RAF Manston. Gibson wrote to Cochrane who raised his concerns about this 'criminal' breach of security at the highest levels.

From the beginning of May squadron training shifted to the tactical aspects of the operation. On 1 May Gibson communicated to Wallis his confidence that the operation would succeed. He repeated this optimism in his weekly report to Whitworth on 4 May where he described the squadron as "ready to operate". On 6 May he held a conference with the pilots to explain the tactical aspects. They flew a rehearsal that evening with Gibson directing a group by radio telephony (R/T) on the spot over the Eyebrook and Abberton Reservoirs. A second group went to the Derwent Reservoir and a third to the Wash. On 10 May, Satterly sent the draft handwritten operation order to Whitworth for review and revision, to be returned by 1600 on 12 May. It included, how the squadron would be split into waves to attack the targets, reserves, likely defences and exit routes; Gibson provided detailed comments. Despite Gibson's confidence, there still had not been a successful release of a live Upkeep, which took until 11 May. Most of the crews were able to practise at Reculver on the Kent coast from 11 to 14 May. Gibson practised at Reculver in Lancaster ED932/AJ-G, the aircraft he used on the raid. The aircraft's call letters were the same as his father's initials: AJG. On 14 May the squadron flew on a full dress rehearsal designed to simulate the routes, targets and the geography of the raid. Gibson took Whitworth with him and described the outcome in his log book as "completely successful".

Cochrane travelled to Scampton on 15 May to inform Whitworth and Gibson that the operation would take place the following evening, over 16/17 May. At about 16:00, Gibson travelled with Cochrane on his return to Grantham. Here he discussed the draft operation order with Satterly and Wing Commander Dunn, No. 5 Group's chief signals officer. He returned to Scampton and at 18:00 at Whitworth's house, along with Wallis, he briefed Young and Maudsley, his flight commanders, and Hopgood, the deputy leader, and Hay, the squadron's bombing leader. He had obtained Cochrane's verbal agreement for Hopgood and Hay to attend, which proved beneficial as Hopgood was able to point out the new defences at Huls. After the meeting broke up, Whitworth informed Gibson that his dog, named Nigger, had been killed in a road accident. It did not seem to affect Gibson outwardly. He was aware how superstitious some aircrew could be, as the dog was the squadron's mascot. Wallis feared it was a dreadful omen.

== Raid of 16/17 May 1943 ==
=== Briefings during 16 May ===
The first thing Gibson did early on the morning of 16 May was to report to the Medical Officer because of pains in his feet. The MO had previously diagnosed gout but he could not prescribe painkillers as these might affect Gibson's alertness when flying. As Gibson felt he had no choice but to fly, he decided to continue as he was. The first briefing was at midday when Gibson and Wallis explained the details of the raid to the pilots and navigators. The next one was at 14:30 and included the bomb aimers and gunners. At 18:00 all the aircrew were called to a final briefing in the upper briefing room, which was guarded.

Gibson explained how they were going "to attack the great dams of Germany". He then introduced Wallis who explained how Upkeep would be used against the dams. Cochrane then spoke and emphasised how they would do "a tremendous amount of damage" but their exploits would remain secret. Gibson explained the operational details again and made it clear no crews were to return with their mine. He handed over to Wing Commander Dunn who explained the signals procedures. The meeting broke up and the crews went for their meal at 19:30.

=== Flight to the Möhne Dam ===
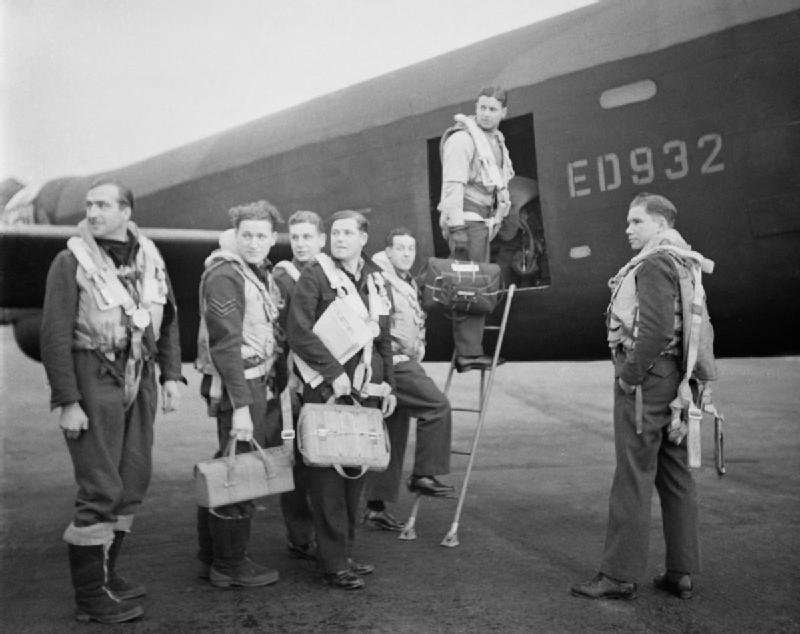
Gibson (on the ladder) and his crew board their plane for Operation Chastise

Gibson was driven out to his aircraft AJ-G by his regular driver, Eileen Strawson. Cochrane came out to Gibson's aircraft to wish him well. A photo was taken of the crew entering the aircraft beforehand. Gibson took off at 21:39 with Hopgood and Martin. They flew out over Skegness and Cromer. The winds were stronger than forecast, as a result they made landfall later and further south than expected. Gibson had the route adjusted to Roosendaal and they flew on unopposed to the Rhine. Again they were too far south, about 6 mi (9.7 km) from the expected landmark and received flak from barges on the river and batteries on the banks. They had similar navigation problems until they reached the target. They found the defences at the Möhne Dam as described at the briefing. There was an active light flak battery but no searchlights or barrage balloons.

=== Attack on the Möhne Dam ===
Gibson made a dummy run over the dam to look the target over and reported how he "liked the look of it". The second formation of three led by Young arrived at this point. Gibson made his bombing run but the bomb was released short and did not damage the dam. It took about five minutes for the water to settle down after the explosion. He then called in Hopgood to make his attack. He watched as Hopgood's aircraft was hit by flak, caught fire and then exploded. Hopgood's crew had managed to release their bomb but it overshot and destroyed an electrical station below the dam. Gibson waited again for the water to settle. He then called in Martin to make his attack but this time decided to fly with him, parallel and slightly ahead, to draw off the flak. Martin's mine did not damage the dam. Gibson called in Young and Martin flew alongside him, whilst Gibson flew along another evasive path. It was not obvious until Maltby started the next bombing run that Young's mine had breached the dam. At 00:56, Hutchinson sent the code word "N I G G E R" (sic), the name of Gibson's recently killed dog, to signal the breach to HQ 5 Group and then confirmed it on their request. Martin and Maltby departed for home.

=== Attack on the Eder Dam ===
After breaching the Möhne dam, Gibson flew with Young as his deputy and the remaining aircraft that still had their mines, to the Eder See. Shannon had arrived with Young while Maudslay and Knight had arrived while Hopgood had been preparing for his bombing run. The flight to the Eder See lasted about 14 minutes. They did not fly in formation and did not encounter any opposition. The dam was difficult to find and there was early morning mist starting to gather over the water. Shannon arrived too far west and found the Rehbuch dam. Gibson's aircraft fired red Very lights to help him find the others. Although the dam's defences consisted of only two sentries with rifles, it was still a difficult target owing to the approach. Shannon flew three dummy runs and then Maudsley flew two. Shannon flew two more dummy runs before finally releasing his bomb, which did not breach the dam. When Maudslay released his bomb it hit a parapet and his plane appeared to get caught in the explosion. However, there were messages from the aircraft and it is possible that it survived this and crash-landed later. Gibson called in Astell but did not seem to realise he was not present. He then called in Knight, who made a single dummy run before releasing his bomb. It breached the dam. At 01:54, Hutchinson signalled the breach and then confirmed it.

=== Return flight, debriefing and questionnaire ===
Gibson returned via the Möhne dam and the third exit route. At 02:10, he received an enquiry from HQ 5 Group, asking whether any crews were available to attack the Sorpe. He replied that there were not. He had an uneventful flight home and landed at 04:15 with just three small holes in his aircraft's tail. He attended a debriefing and like all the pilots who returned from this raid, he had to complete a special questionnaire about the target and behaviour of the weapon. The pilots were invited to make additional comments. Gibson's comments included how VHF had proved a "perfect" method to control the raid.

== Aftermath ==
One of Gibson's first tasks after his own debriefing was to deal with the early returns. He accepted that Munro's aircraft had sustained significant damage and Rice's mine had fallen off. Gibson was furious with Anderson because he returned with his bomb, despite the instructions at the briefing. The crew were posted off the squadron with immediate effect, although the squadron's official records show they left in early June. At 08:30 he received a lengthy message from Cochrane thanking him for his efforts in making the raid a success.

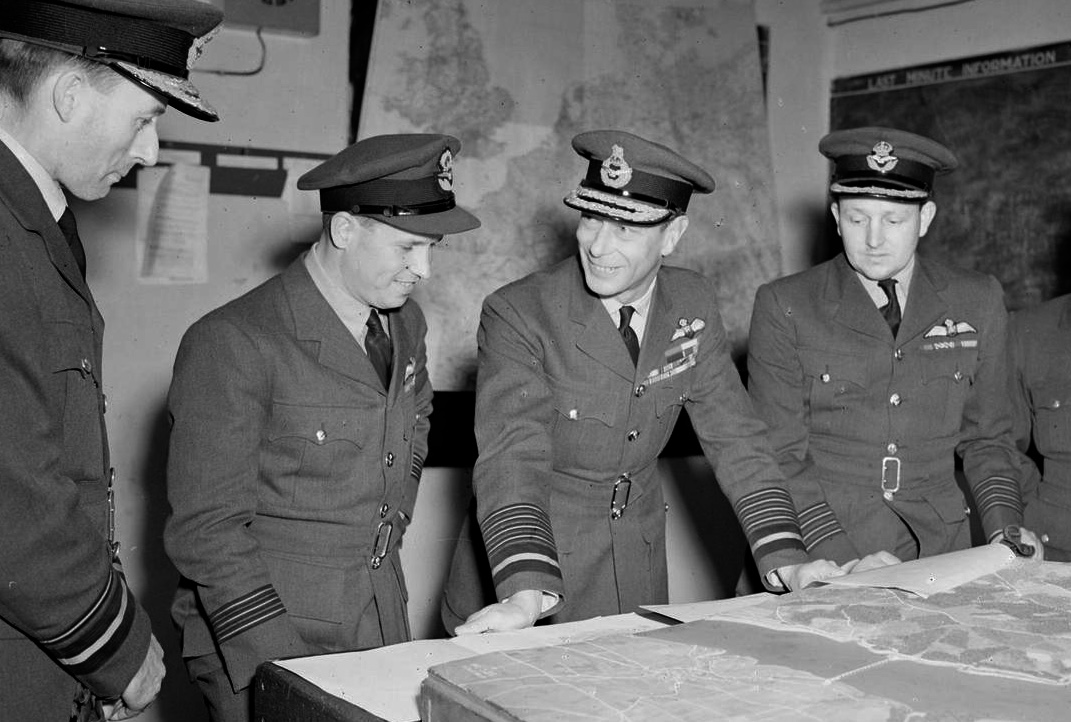
Air Vice Marshal Ralph Cochrane, Wing Commander Guy Gibson, King George VI and Group Captain John Whitworth discuss the Dambuster Raid during the King's visit to RAF Scampton on 27 May 1943.

On 27 May the King and Queen visited Scampton. There was lunch in the officers' mess followed by an inspection of the squadron. Gibson showed the King models and photos of the dams. The King chose the motto for the new squadron 'Apres Moi Le Deluge'. On 28 May Archibald Sinclair, the Secretary of State for Air visited Scampton. Gibson then went on a fortnight's leave to Cornwall where he spent most of his time fishing.

As the full extent of the losses – eight aircraft and 56 crew – became apparent, Wallis became distraught at the human cost. Humphreys and Hevron started the task of informing the next of kin. A party was organised at RAF Woodhall Spa on the evening of 17 May and Gibson attended but he made sure a beer was sent to Humphreys with his compliments. It took three days to complete the telegrams and follow-up letters. Gibson continued his usual practice of adding personal comments to letters where possible.

On 18 May, there was a parade where Cochrane and Gibson made speeches to the squadron members. He then released the air crews from duty on seven days' leave and half the ground crew on three days' leave. Gibson went on weekend leave to Penarth. On the Sunday he received a call from Harris to inform him he had been awarded the Victoria Cross (VC). His response was subdued as he felt responsible for those he had recruited and who had not returned, particularly Hopgood. He was reported as saying: "It all seems so unfair".

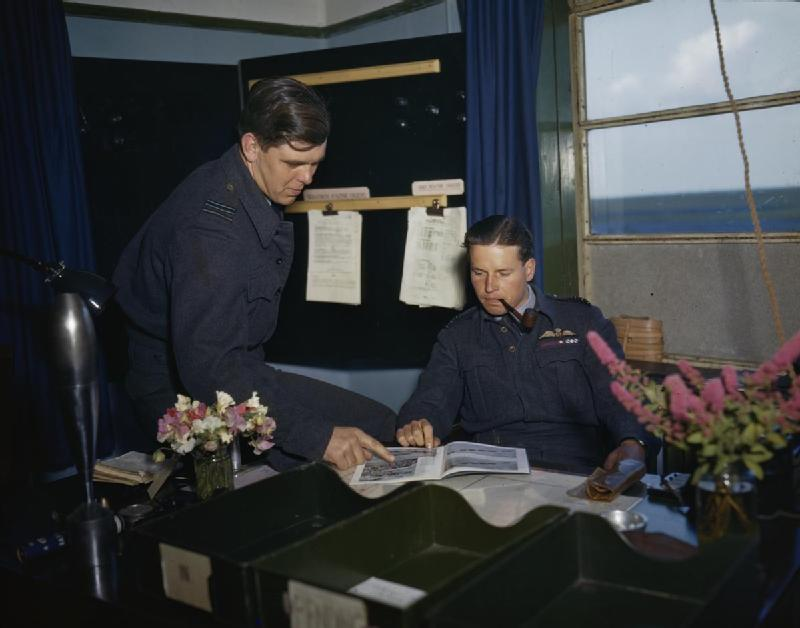
Wing Commander Guy Gibson (Right) and S/Ldr David Maltby (left) at RAF Scampton, on 22 July 1943 after the raid.

On 22 June, Gibson and all the other newly decorated members of 617 Squadron attended an investiture at Buckingham Palace. It was performed by the Queen as the King was in North Africa. She presented Gibson with his VC and the Bar to his DSO first, and in making him the most highly decorated serviceman in the country. After the investitures all the crews went on to the Hungaria Restaurant to a dinner arranged by AV Roe, the builders of the Lancaster. Gibson was presented with a silver model of a Lancaster by the company's chairman, Thomas Sopwith. Also at the dinner were Roy Chadwick, the designer of the Lancaster, and Wallis.

Harris made arrangements to ensure Gibson was rested from operations and on 24 July he and his wife were invited to lunch at Chequers as guests of the Prime Minister, Winston Churchill. Here Gibson was shown a film smuggled out of Germany about the concentration camps. On 2 August, Gibson made his last flight with 617 Squadron. He flew with his regular crew and his successor, Wing Commander George Holden, to Eyebrook Reservoir to familiarise him with the technique to release Upkeep.

== Post-Chastise activities ==
=== Tour of Canada and US ===
On 3 August Gibson travelled to London to join the party accompanying the Prime Minister to the Quadrant Conference in Quebec City, Canada. Around midnight they were taken by a special train to Faslane where they boarded the Queen Mary, setting sail around 17:30 on 4 August.

The party included some of the most senior military figures such as Lord Louis Mountbatten, Chief of Combined Operations and Air Chief Marshal Sir Charles Portal, Chief of the Air Staff. Gibson was therefore an outsider, like fellow passenger, Brigadier Orde Wingate, the Chindits leader. However, unlike Wingate, he seems to have found it easier to enter into shipboard life. Mary Churchill, who was travelling as her father's aide-de-camp, found Gibson "had all the aura of a hero" and also "very agreeable and debonair to talk to". On the last evening of the voyage, on 8 August, after dinner, Gibson was invited to address the whole party on the Dams Raid.

On 9 August they arrived in Halifax, Nova Scotia, and were transferred by special trains to Quebec. A certain amount of disinformation circulated around their arrival including how Gibson had acted as the pilot on the aircraft that had flown Churchill across the Atlantic. They arrived at a time of significant tension between the British and Canadian governments. The Canadians were unhappy with the relative lack of credit being granted to the Royal Canadian Air Force's (RCAF) contribution to the war effort. On 11 August, Gibson attended a select luncheon with the Prime Minister, where he was introduced to the Canadian Prime Minister, Mackenzie King. He spent the rest of the afternoon at an RCAF recruiting centre.

On 12 August Gibson attended a press conference arranged in his honour. It was hosted by C.G. Power, the Canadian Minister of National Defence for Air and attended by hundreds of journalists from around the world. Gibson responded to questions about the Dams Raid and revealed the Prime Minister called him "Dam-buster". Reports of the conference were enthusiastic. He attended engagements in the Quebec area. On 17 August, President Franklin D. Roosevelt arrived at the Conference. Churchill arranged for Gibson to meet the President at a private meeting.

Gibson left Quebec on 20 August to start the Canadian leg of his tour. It was a punishing schedule and included civic receptions and speeches, motorcades, interviews, broadcasts, along with travel. He went to Montreal, Ottawa, Toronto and London (Ontario). As Churchill was in New York, on 5 September, Gibson was diverted there to make a radio broadcast which was heard on station WJZ New York. In Winnipeg he met the family of Harvey Glinz, who had been killed on the Dams Raid when flying as the front-gunner in Barlow's crew. He then went on to training bases at Carberry, Rivers, Dafoe, Moose Jaw and Moss Bank.

On 11 September he arrived in Calgary. Here he met the mother of the navigator in his own Dams Raid crew, Mrs Taerum. He spent time with her at home the following day. (Note: Taerum was killed in Operation Garlic against the Dortmund-Ems canal on 15 September along with four others of Gibson's crew from the Dams Raid) He also met Leading Aircraftman Robert Young, the younger brother of Squadron Leader Young, also killed on the Dams raid. He continued on to Vancouver and Victoria before returning to Montreal and Ottawa in the east. He had a week's rest at the Seignory Club in Ottawa from 28 September to 3 October.

On 4 October he began the United States leg of his tour in Washington, D.C. He attended a major press conference at the offices of the British Information Service in New York on 7 October. This was "at a time when the first American airmen were coming home 'tour expired' after 25 operations. During questions one young lady asked, 'Wing Commander Gibson, how many operations have you been on over Germany?' He replied, 'One hundred and seventy-four.' There was a stunned silence".

On 19 October, Gibson was invested with the Commander's Insignia to the Legion of Merit by General Henry H. Arnold at Bolling Field near Washington D.C. The decision to award him with the Legion of Merit was taken quickly. It was also exceptional. To avoid duplication American awards were, in general, not accepted for actions which had already earned a British medal. This allowed them to be restricted to cases where Americans wished to express particular gratitude. For example, they were often given for the air/sea rescue of American personnel. The award was announced formally in Britain in December 1943.

Gibson continued on to Chicago, Minneapolis and then to Los Angeles, where he stayed with the film director Howard Hawks. Most his time was spent in private, his reward for his gruelling tour. However, it is possible he might have been giving technical advice on a proposed film of the Dams Raid. Hawks had commissioned Roald Dahl to write a script for the film and had started to build models of the dams and Lancaster bombers. He was encouraged by Bomber Command's PR Department. However, when Wallis was shown the script, he thought it absurd, and the project was scrapped.

Gibson returned to Montreal and flew back to Britain in a B-24 Liberator being ferried across the Atlantic. He landed at Prestwick on 1 December and was met by a representative from the Ministry of Intelligence. On his return he was exhausted, but still went straight from home in London to Scampton to visit 617 Squadron. When he arrived he was informed that they had moved to Coningsby, and was driven over. He visited HQ 5 Group in an attempt to obtain an operational posting, but was declared non-operational sick and sent on a month's rest leave. At the end of his leave he was due to be posted to the Directorate of Accidents with the order to write a book. During this time he was hospitalised with Vincent's Angina on 17 December.

The view emerged that as a result of the tour he had acquired and retained an increased sense of his own importance. In July 1944 Harris wrote to Cochrane to comment that the Americans had "spoiled young Gibson". Therefore, this route was not pursued again later in the war with other highly decorated airmen, such as Leonard Cheshire.

=== Directorate for the Prevention of Accidents: writing Enemy Coast Ahead ===
In January 1944, Gibson was posted to the Directorate for the Prevention of Accidents, where he appears to have been under orders to write a book. This posting was effectively a cover to give him the time and access to the resources he needed to complete it. It is possible either the Ministry of Intelligence or the RAF's publicity department wanted him to complete a book in order to counter the increasing criticisms of the Strategic Air Offensive.

Gibson was seated in a small back room and had access to a dictaphone and typist. He did not seem to take well to his assignment initially; when Heveron travelled from Scampton to deliver some information about 617 Squadron, he found Gibson depressed and with long hair.

Gibson did seem to become increasingly enthusiastic about writing, and his wife remembered his writing at home during weekends while he was at Staff College during March–May 1944. The typescript survives of a draft Gibson submitted in summer 1944, which his wife later donated to the RAF Museum at Hendon. The writing has Gibson's characteristic style of comments and humour, implying that the book was not ghost-written, as some have suggested. The typescript includes corrections in his own hand, which may suggest he had the help of a professional editor while he was writing. The text was passed by the censors, who edited out some of his more intolerant political and social views as well as operational information. He completed his final draft in September 1944.

=== Appearance on Desert Island Discs ===
On 19 February 1944, Gibson appeared as the castaway on Desert Island Discs with Roy Plomley.

=== Politics, prospective parliamentary candidate for Macclesfield ===
Garfield Weston, the Conservative Member of Parliament for Macclesfield, was due to retire and was looking for a replacement. In February 1944 he approached Gibson to suggest he consider standing for Parliament. Gibson agreed, but first he had to be selected by the local party. Gibson made visits to Macclesfield to campaign for selection. On one occasion he shared a platform with Lord Vansittart, who gave his name – Vansittartism – to a form of collective German guilt for the war. A short-list of candidates was drawn up, which also included Air Vice Marshal Don Bennett. Gibson was selected by a narrow margin and became the Conservative prospective parliamentary candidate for the constituency. Despite the constituency party's having taken him on knowing his circumstances as a serving officer, Gibson resigned as their candidate in August 1944 citing the demands of his service career.

== Return to operations ==
=== Staff College and Base Staff Officer ===
Gibson attended a staff course at the RAF Staff College at Bulstrode Park near Gerrards Cross from the end of March to May 1944. He then went on leave. During the last week, he became very restless as he learned about the D-Day landings. He feared the war would end before he could get back into the action. On his return, he appealed straight to Harris. Four days later, he was appointed as a staff officer at No. 55 Base, RAF East Kirkby to understudy to the Base Air Staff Officer (BASO). Duties included operational planning and liaison between the units within the Base.

On 5 July, he flew in a Lancaster for the first time since leaving No. 617 Squadron. It was a test flight and the crew commented that he handled it well considering how long it had been since he had last flown. On 19 July he joined a Lancaster crew, possibly from No. 630 Squadron, located at East Kirkby, during an attack on a V-1 flying bomb launch site at Criel-sur-Mer in France. He pasted an aiming point photo from the operation in his log book.

On 2 August, he was posted to No. 54 Base, RAF Coningsby, where he arrived on the 4th. Coningsby was a centre for tactical innovation and home of the elite No. 54 Base Flight. Here he was exposed to intelligence that increased his concern that the war would end without him getting back into the action. At this stage, he may have had Cochrane's consent for limited operational flying, provided it was non-participatory, short time over target and he could bail out over Allied-controlled territory.

On 15 August, he flew in a Lightning as an observer on a daylight raid over Deelen in the Netherlands. He made a similar flight in a Lightning a few days later to Le Havre. On 2 September, he flew a Mosquito to Scatsta in Shetland.

=== Death ===
On 19 September, an order came through from Bomber Command for No. 5 Group to prepare for an attack on Bremen. Planes from No. 5 Group would be responsible for all aspects of the operation, including target illumination and marking and control of the raid. Cochrane, the AOC, would be responsible for tactics and route planning. As the day progressed, the weather forecast changed, and at 16:45 an order came through to change to the reserve targets at Rheydt and Moenchen-Gladbach.

At the flight planning conference it was decided that three areas would be attacked simultaneously; they were designated as red, green and yellow. The red area was Rheydt town centre, where the attack would be fully controlled by a master bomber who would monitor the marking and coordinate the main force bombing. The tactics – dispersed marking – were untried and unrehearsed, and therefore would require expertise from the controller and markers. The announcement that Gibson would be the controller was met with general incredulity. It was assumed it would be a regular controller from No. 54 Base Flight or a qualified one from No. 627 Squadron. Some suspicion started to circulate that the proposed complexity may have come from Gibson and his lack of experience in marking techniques.

As Gibson did not have a regular navigator, one had to be found to fly with him. The first choice (Charles Clark DFC) was ill, so Squadron Leader Jim Warwick was selected. He was the Station Navigation Officer and therefore screened from operations. There was also no serviceable Mosquito available at Coningsby for Gibson to use, so it was decided to use the reserve aircraft of No. 627 Squadron, located at RAF Woodhall Spa. Gibson and Warwick were driven over. When they arrived about 18:30, for unknown reasons, Gibson rejected the reserve aircraft KB213 and insisted on using the Mosquito B.XX KB267 instead. The crew who were expecting to fly in KB267 were unhappy with the change. As the two crews were performing different functions, the bomb loads had to be swapped. They took off at 19:51.

When they arrived at the target, the marking of the red area went badly wrong owing to a series of mishaps. The three markers could not identify the marking point and one aircraft had engine problems. Gibson attempted to mark it himself but his Target Indicators (TIs) did not release. As the illumination from the flares was fading, he called for more flares and warned the red section of the main force not to bomb. He then commanded them to stand by, so they started to turn away from the target. This was potentially dangerous and exposed them to further risk from flak and night fighters. Some started to bomb the green area, either out of confusion or nervousness. He then authorised the remaining aircraft to bomb the green area. The red area was eventually marked, but it was too late to direct any of the main force's aircraft to attack it. The raid concluded at 21:58. The time of Gibson's departure from the target is unknown. It is possible that he loitered in a wide, high orbit to assess the outcome and left around 22:00. One crew from No. 61 Squadron claimed they heard him say he had a damaged engine.

Gibson's aircraft crashed at Steenbergen in the Netherlands at around 22:30 and lit up in flames. Witnesses heard an aircraft flying low, saw that its cockpit was illuminated and then it crashed. At first, Gibson's failure to return to Woodhall Spa was not considered out of the ordinary, as it was assumed he had landed at Coningsby. Likewise at Coningsby there was no immediate concern as there was fog and it was assumed he would have landed elsewhere. However, it soon became apparent he had not returned. The rumour spread rapidly around No. 5 Group that he was missing. He was not posted officially as missing until 29 November, although Prime Minister Winston Churchill was informed on 26 September: "The Air Ministry have told us that Wing Commander Gibson, V.C. is reported missing from a recent raid in which he flew a Mosquito to Munchen Gladbach".

=== Funeral ===
At Steenbergen, the Germans cordoned off the crash site at the Graaf Hendrikpolder. Human remains were recovered which confirmed there had been one person in the plane and therefore initially it was suspected the other member may have bailed out. However, with the discovery of a third hand, the presence of a second person was confirmed. Jim Warwick was identified from his identity tag. The laundry tag in a sock identified the other person as a "Guy Gibson". The remains were placed in a small specially constructed coffin.

The local deputy mayor, Mr. Herbers, wanted to give the men a proper funeral. They hired a horse-drawn hearse from nearby Halsteren. The coffin was draped with the flag of the Netherlands and was laid to rest in the Catholic cemetery. The funeral was attended by the Catholic priest, Father Verhoeven and the Protestant Pastor van den Brink. As they did not know the men's religion they performed the funeral between them. Father Verhoeven read the psalm, De Profundis and Pastor van den Brink spoke the Lord's Prayer in English. A cross was erected over the grave with Warwick's full rank and name with the name "Guy Gibson" underneath. When it was later confirmed who "Guy Gibson" was, a new cross was constructed with Gibson's rank, name and decorations.

=== Analysis and theories of the crash ===
The exact cause of Gibson's crash is unknown. There are number of theories, some more likely than others. Various factors may have contributed to the loss of his Mosquito. One theory advanced is that the accident was due to Gibson's lack of experience flying Mosquitoes. His log book, which he had last updated on 16 September, detailed 9 hours and 35 minutes flying Mosquitoes. It was observed it took him three attempts to land at Scatsta. He had been on one training flight on 31 August to learn how to dive bomb, and Mosquito crews knew they had to practise regularly, particularly in pulling out of dives. Also, he had not rehearsed the emergency procedures to exit a Mosquito, which could take 30 seconds, even on the ground.

The same lack of experience flying the Mosquito applied to his navigator, Squadron Leader Warwick, who had never flown in one operationally. That a letter was found with Warwick's address (RAF Coningsby) on it suggests Warwick's inclusion on the flight was a very late decision. He was experienced and would have known not to take anything like an addressed letter with him under normal circumstances.

Harris wrote that Gibson appointed himself as the controller. It is possible he seized this opportunity in Air Commodore Sharpe's absence when the late change in target was announced. There were some instances of Mosquitoes breaking up because of their wooden frames. Harris considered this as a possibility, however, it is unlikely. Lack of fuel is the explanation most favoured by members of No. 627 Squadron at the time. In December 1985 the site was excavated and wreckage from the plane recovered. No enemy damage was noticeable. It has therefore been suggested that Gibson and Warwick had failed to switch fuel tanks at the correct time. It has also been suggested there was a fault with the fuel tank selector. Further, it is possible that a lack of familiarity with the Mosquito resulted in neither Gibson nor Warwick being able to find the switches to swap the fuel supply. This would also be a reason to explain why the cockpit was illuminated: they were attempting to locate the switches. In either case, the result would be that the aircraft simply ran out of fuel.

If Gibson left Rheydt at 22:00 then it is estimated he was about 70 miles short of the expected location if the aircraft had been operating normally. Therefore, it is possible the aircraft was flying underpowered at the time of the crash, perhaps from some sort of damage.

Speculation persists that Gibson's Mosquito may have been shot down by German night-fighter ace Kurt Welter. On the night of the raid, 19 September 1944, Welter was the only German pilot to have claimed a Mosquito shot down that night, and Gibson's Mosquito the only one lost. However, a listing of Luftwaffe claims transcribed from the original microfilms shows that Welter's claim was on the night of 18/19 September, and was north of Wittenberg, in the area southwest of Berlin, more than 500 km (310 miles) from Steenbergen. Welter claimed his Mosquito at 23:05 hours near Gütersloh, and recent research indicates that it was actually an intruder Mosquito FB.VI PZ177 of No. 23 Squadron. The crew, Flying Officer K. Eastwood and navigator Flight Lieutenant G.G. Rogers, were both killed.

Gibson was possibly not where others might have expected him to be. During the briefing for the raid, he was advised to use an exit route that would put him over France. However, he disagreed and insisted he would return by the shortest route at low level.

=== Posthumous tributes ===
Gibson's death was formally announced on 8 January 1945. However, many knew of his loss before this date.

On 19 December 1944, Churchill wrote to Eve Gibson:

I had great admiration for him – the glorious Dam-buster. I had hoped that he would come into Parliament and make his way there after the stress of the war was over, but he never spared himself nor would allow others to spare him. We have lost in this officer one of the most splendid of all our fighting men. His name will not be forgotten; it will for ever be enshrined in the most wonderful records of our country.

In his introduction to Enemy Coast Ahead, Sir Arthur Harris described Gibson as:

As great a warrior as this island ever bred.

Barnes Wallis said of Gibson:

For some men of great courage and adventure, inactivity was a slow death. Would a man like Gibson ever have adjusted back to peacetime life? One can imagine it would have been a somewhat empty existence after all he had been through. Facing death had become his drug. He had seen countless friends and comrades perish in the great crusade. Perhaps something in him even welcomed the inevitability he had always felt that before the war ended he would join them in their Bomber Command Valhalla. He had pushed his luck beyond all limits and he knew it. But that was the kind of man he was…a man of great courage, inspiration and leadership. A man born for war…but born to fall in war.

== Personal life ==
Gibson met Eve Moore, a show dancer and actress, in December 1939 when she was performing in the revue Come Out To Play at the New Hippodrome Theatre, Coventry. He later claimed that they met at a party. She claimed he saw the revue three nights in succession before introducing himself to her on the fourth and accompanying her to a cast party.

She was born Evelyn Mary Moore in Penarth, Wales, on 27 December 1911, which made her seven years older than Gibson. He became infatuated with her and travelled to meet her during his leave whenever he could as the revue progressed around the country. He also found opportunities to pursue her while on duty. He volunteered to fly Hampdens to RAF St Athan, only twelve miles from Cardiff and conveniently close to Penarth. He managed to arrange a stopover in Glasgow when travelling to Lossiemouth.

Gibson proposed to Eve in October 1940 and she accepted. On 21 November, he flew down to Cardiff in a Blenheim. They were married in Penarth's Anglican Church on 23 November. Gibson's Aunt Gwennie and Uncle John attended, but reports that Gibson's father attended his wedding with his new wife are regarded as untrue.

Eve returned with him to Lincolnshire. They lodged in a bed-sit room in the Lion and Royal pub in Navenby. She was on her own most of the time and quickly became very unhappy. When No. 29 Squadron moved to West Malling, they moved into a cottage, Clare Cottage. She joined in the station's social life taking part in revues and musicals. She could also travel more easily to London from Kent. When Gibson was posted to Cranfield, she decided to return to Penarth. In summer 1942 she found a job in London and moved there, where she shared a flat with a girlfriend. They both had casual relationships outside their marriage. They last met in August 1944 around Gibson's birthday, and he seems to have been ready to discuss a divorce, although she seemed to want to try again when the war had finished. After Gibson's death, Eve married in 1950 a South African businessman, Jack Hyman.

In the early 1990s, during research for his book, Richard Morris interviewed Margaret Masters, who formed a close relationship with Gibson during late 1942–44. As Margaret North, she was a member of the medical team called out on 8 December 1942 from RAF Rauceby to RAF Syerston to attend to Group Captain Walker. She was a WAAF corporal and a theatre nurse in the Crash and Burn Unit. When Gibson returned to Rauceby the following day to visit Walker, she and Gibson started talking and he asked her out. They would visit pubs and go to the cinema. As she was part of the RAF, she understood his world and she became his confidante. She helped him with an incident of operational stress in mid-January 1943. As he was married and therefore unavailable, in February 1943 she decided to marry someone else. They kept in contact and Gibson became her son's godfather. She moved to live with her mother in Bognor Regis and they met there for the last time in summer 1944.

== Postwar legacy ==
=== Steenbergen ===
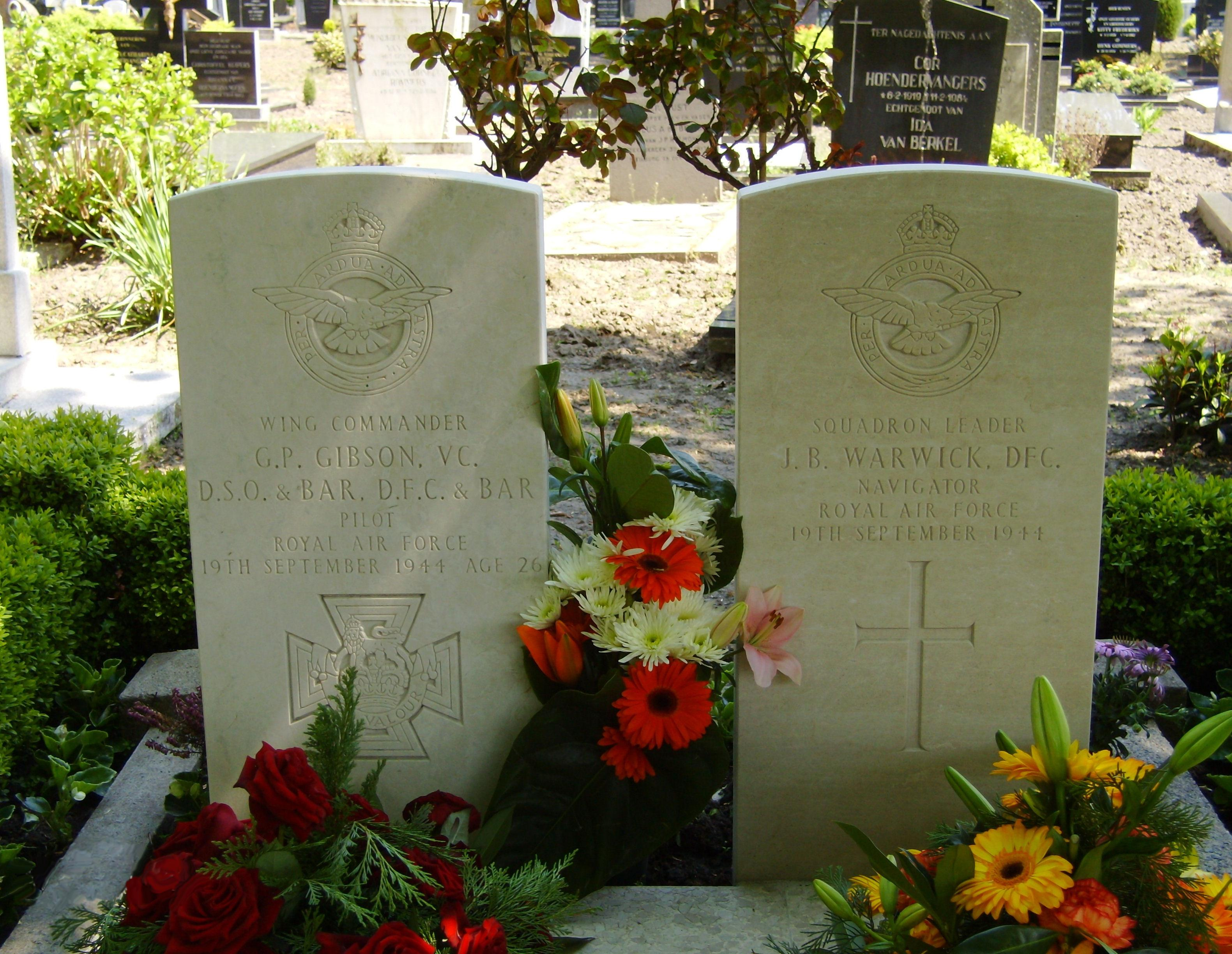
Graves of Gibson and Warwick in Steenbergen, Netherlands

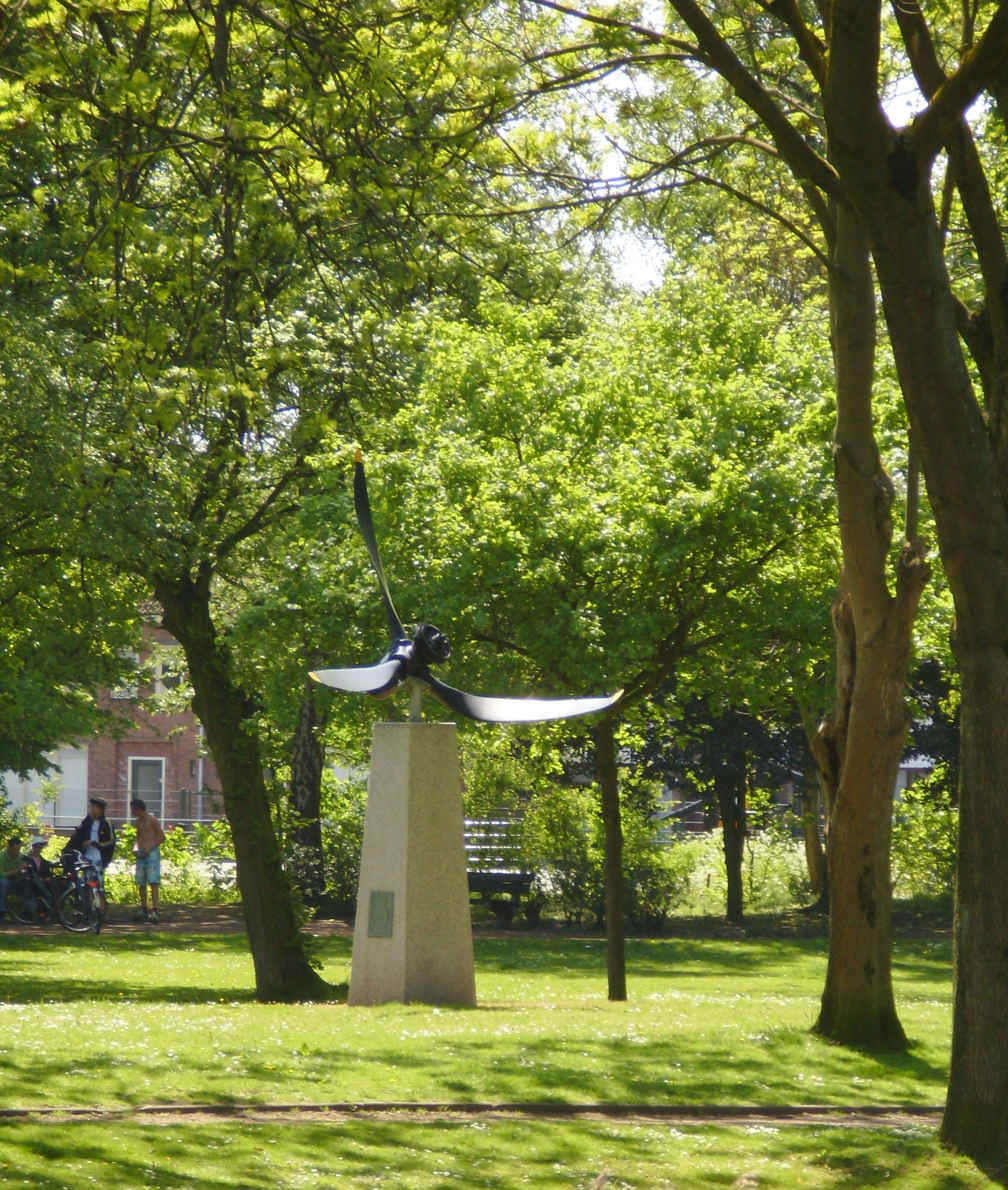
Dam Busters memorial park, Steenbergen, Netherlands

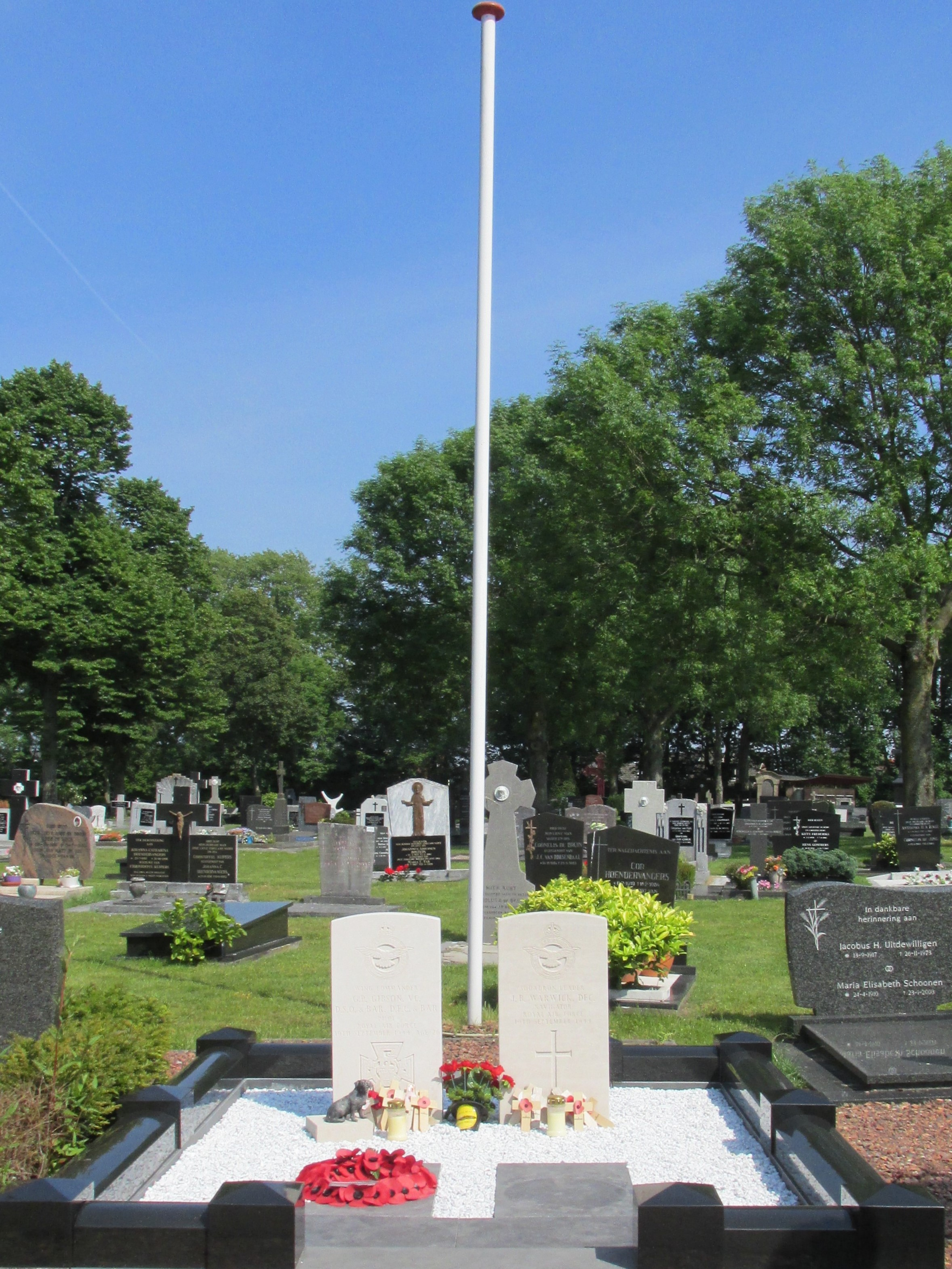
New Grave surround for Wg Cdr Gibson and Sqn Ldr Warwick

The Commonwealth War Graves Commission (CWGC) maintains Gibson's and Warwick's graves, which are still in Steenbergen's Catholic Cemetery. After the war, the CWGC suggested the graves be moved back to the United Kingdom or to their cemetery in nearby Bergen op Zoom. However, both Eve and Gibson's father preferred that they be left where they fell.

The town of Steenbergen has since honoured Gibson and Warwick by naming a street after each of them (Gibsonstraat and Warwickstraat); as well as after the Lancaster and the Mosquito. The Gibsonstraat and Warwickstraat are in the vicinity of the fatal crash; the exact location is marked by brick mosaics of the British flag and the year "1944" at 5, Mosquitostraat, between the ends of Gibsonstraat and Warwickstraat.

Also in Steenbergen is the Dambusters Memorial Park. In the park is a memorial to Gibson and Warwick. It is a granite stone topped by the twisted propeller of a Lancaster. It was unveiled by Group Captain Leonard Cheshire on 7 May 1990.

Also there has been a local council initiative that has achieved a citywalk named after Guy Gibson, named "the Gibson walking route", available free of charge, at any local tourist office. The route goes past all relevant places connected to Warwick and Gibsons last flight, their crashsite and honoured graves. Also there has been a small exhibition at the local Hotel Aarden, next to the town entrance and harbour. This is maintained by a local living Englishman and with kind help from (modern) ex-No. 617 Squadron crew members. The RAF have an annual trip planned to visit and honour the Fallen in Steenbergen. No. 617 Squadron was disbanded in 2014, but was later reformed to be the first RAF squadron with the newest fighter aircraft, the Lockheed Martin F-35 Lightning II, in 2018.

=== Porthleven ===
As Gibson had family connections, the Cornish fishing village of Porthleven has named a street after Gibson, Gibson Way. There is a memorial in the village cemetery bearing his name. His name also appears on the village War Memorial overlooking the harbour.

A plaque commemorating Gibson has been mounted in the harbour-facing wall of the institute at Porthleven, located at the southern end of Institute Hill. It reads:

In honour of Wing Commander Guy Penrose Gibson, VC, DSO and Bar, DFC and Bar. Officer Commanding 617 Squadron Bomber Command Royal Air Force later known as the Dambusters, who carried out the daring and successful bombing raid on the German dams of the Ruhr in 1943. Guy's mother was a member of an old Porthleven family of Master Mariners and Porthleven was Guy's English home. 1918–1944

=== Publication of Enemy Coast Ahead ===
Gibson's book, Enemy Coast Ahead, was first serialized in the Sunday Express during December 1944. The book was published in February 1946 by Michael Joseph and was very well received. It has remained in print most of the time since 1946. A new edition of the work was issued by Greenhill Books in 2019, with additional material by Robert Owen, Official Historian of the No. 617 Squadron Association, and historian and broadcaster James Holland.

=== Film portrayal ===
A 1955 film, The Dam Busters, was made of the exploits of No. 617 Squadron; Gibson was played by Richard Todd in the film.

=== Vickers VC10 ===
An RAF Vickers VC10 airliner, serial number XV102, was named Guy Gibson in 1968, soon after it came into service. The aircraft's duties included carrying Margaret Thatcher while she was prime minister, as well as members of the Royal Family. It flew with the RAF until it was withdrawn from service in 2011; it was scrapped in 2012.

=== Fiction ===
Gibson appears as a fictionalized character in Stephen Baxter's The Time Ships, the authorised sequel to The Time Machine. Barnes Wallis also has a role in this story.

=== Commemorative plaque ===
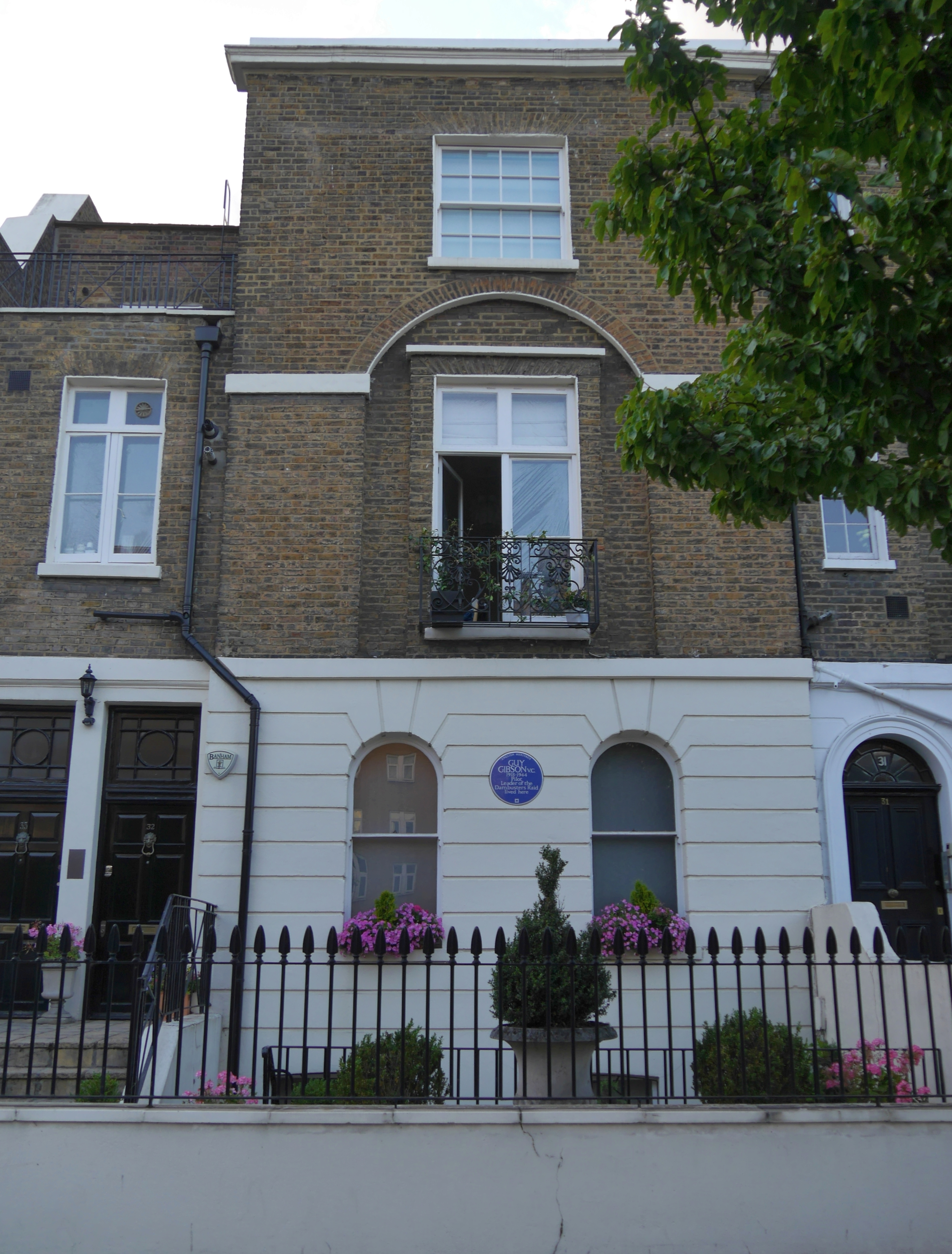
32 Aberdeen Place, London

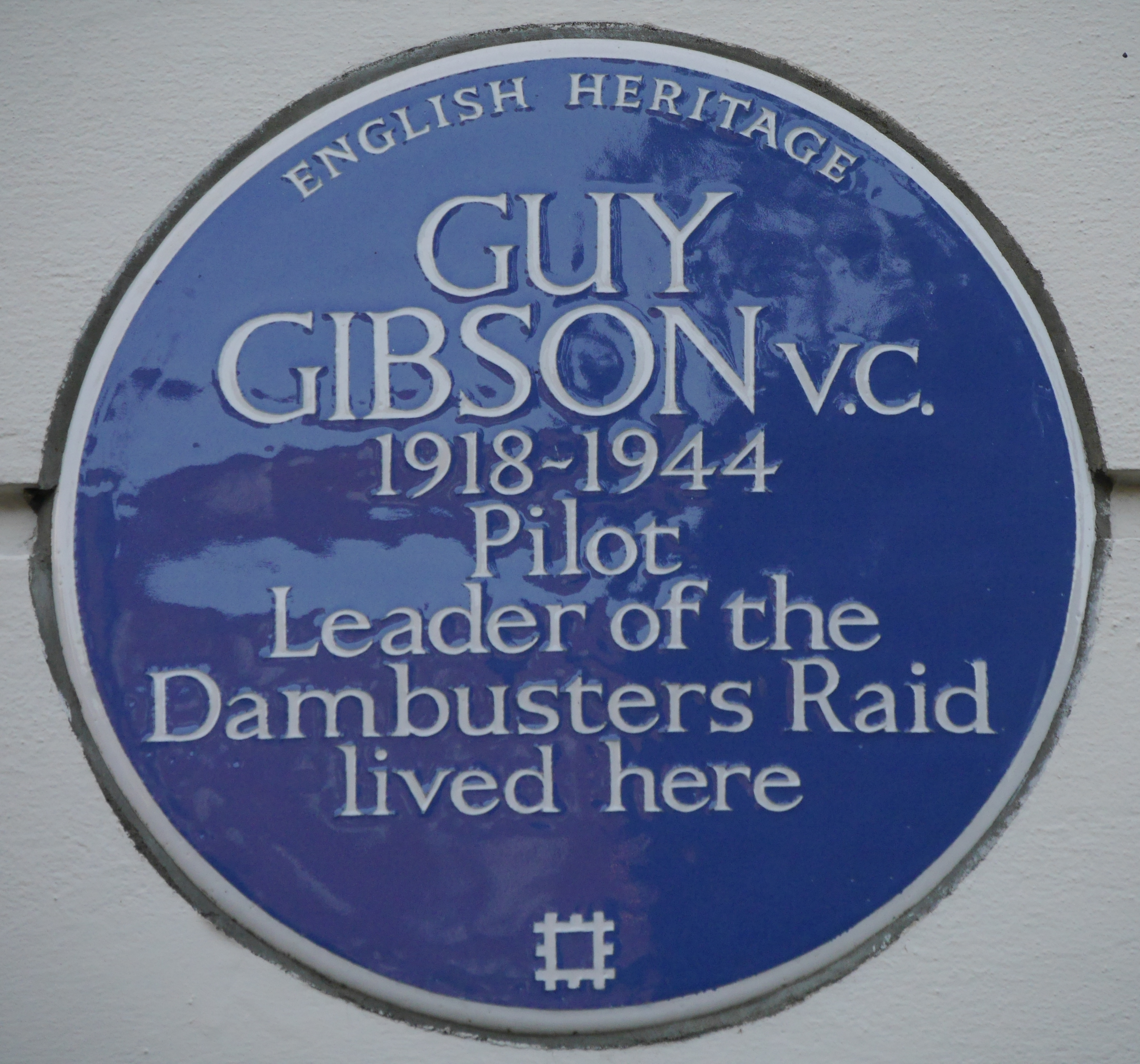
Blue plaque, 32 Aberdeen Place, St John's Wood, London

To commemorate Gibson's residency there is a blue plaque at 32 Aberdeen Place, St John's Wood, north London.

A plaque also marks the house of Eve's parents, where he and Eve occasionally lived between their marriage and 1943, at 1 Archer Road, Penarth.

== Honours, awards and citations ==
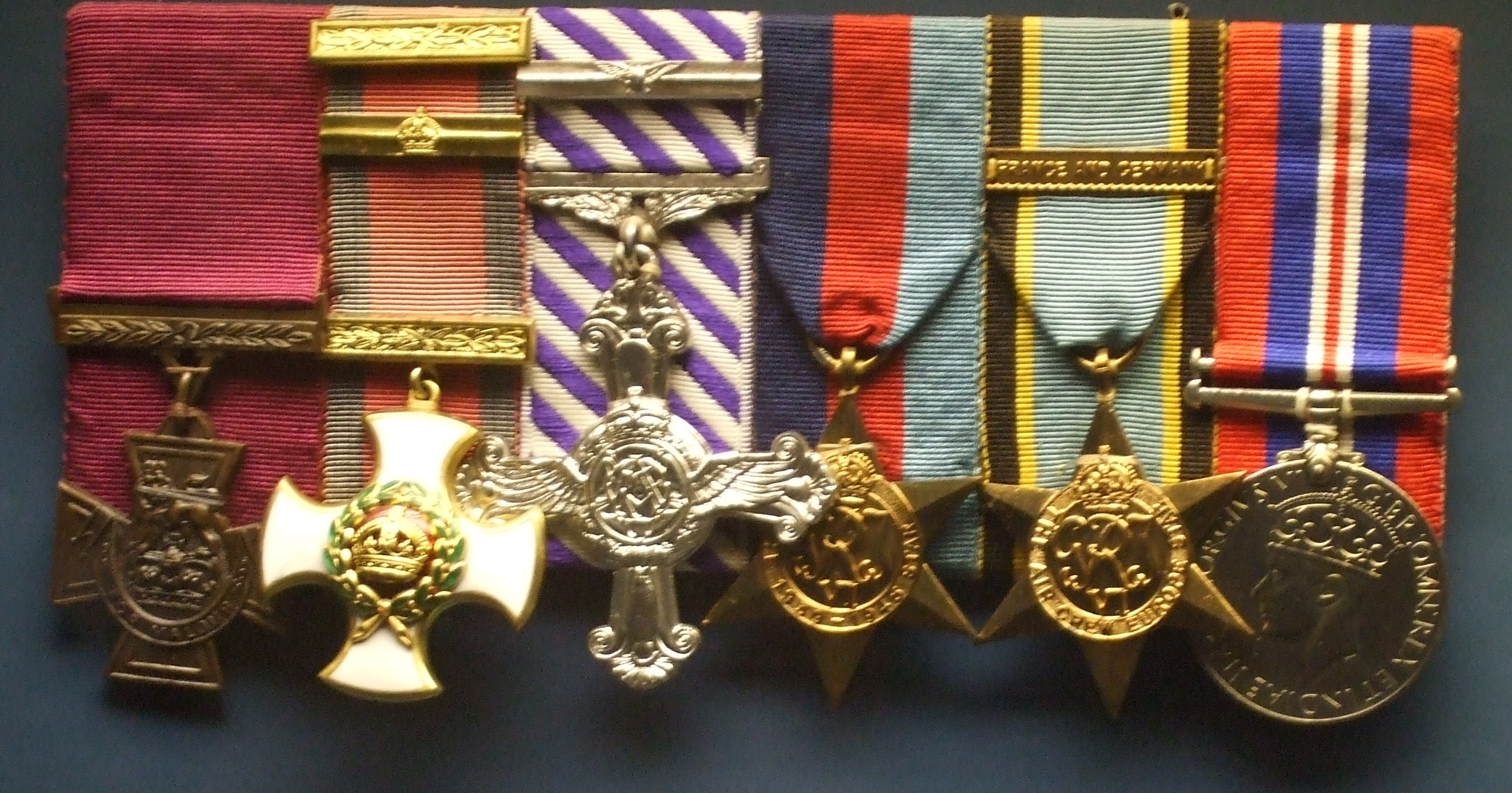
Guy Gibson's medals on display at the RAF museum. The VC is furthest to the left (click through for more information).

Gibson's Victoria Cross and other medals are on display at the Royal Air Force Museum, Hendon, England.

Initially Eve Gibson presented them to the Imperial War Museum. However, in 1956 she presented them to Gibson's father. He wore them to the Remembrance Day parade in 1956. He then passed them on to St Edward's School and they were placed in the school's memorial library until his death in 1968.

Award	Date	Citation
Victoria Cross (VC)	1943	Air Ministry, 28 May 1943. ROYAL AIR FORCE. The KING has been graciously pleased to confer the VICTORIA CROSS on the undermentioned officer in recognition of most conspicuous bravery: — Acting Wing Commander Guy Penrose GIBSON, D.S.O., D.F.C. (39438), Reserve of Air Force Officers, No. 617 Squadron: — This officer served as a night bomber pilot at the beginning of the war and quickly established a reputation as an outstanding operational pilot. In addition to taking the fullest possible share in all normal operations, he made single-handed attacks during his "rest" nights on such highly defended objectives as the German battleship Tirpitz, then completing in Wilhelmshaven. When his tour of operational duty was concluded, he asked for a further operational posting and went to a night-fighter unit instead of being posted for instructional duties. In the course of his second operational tour, he destroyed at least three enemy bombers and contributed much to the raising and development of new night-fighter formations. After a short period in a training unit, he again volunteered for operational duties and returned to night bombers. Both as an operational pilot and as leader of his squadron, he achieved outstandingly successful results and his personal courage knew no bounds. Berlin, Cologne, Danzig, Gdynia, Genoa, Le Creusot, Milan, Nuremberg and Stuttgart were among the targets he attacked by day and by night. On the conclusion of his third operational tour, Wing Commander Gibson pressed strongly to be allowed to remain on operations and he was selected to command a squadron then forming for special tasks. Under his inspiring leadership, this squadron has now executed one of the most devastating attacks of the war—the breaching of the Moehne and Eder dams. The task was fraught with danger and difficulty. Wing Commander Gibson personally made the initial attack on the Moehne dam. Descending to within a few feet of the water and taking the full brunt of the antiaircraft defences, he delivered his attack with great accuracy. Afterwards he circled very low for 30 minutes, drawing the enemy fire on himself in order to leave as free a run as possible to the following aircraft which were attacking the dam in turn. Wing Commander Gibson then led the remainder of his force to the Eder dam where, with complete disregard for his own safety, he repeated his tactics and once more drew on himself the enemy fire so that the attack could be successfully developed. Wing Commander Gibson has completed over 170 sorties, involving more than 600 hours operational flying. Throughout his operational career, prolonged exceptionally at his own request, he has shown leadership, determination and valour of the highest order.
Companion of the Distinguished Service Order and Bar (DSO*)	1942	Distinguished Service Order Acting Wg-Cdr G.P. Gibson, 106 Sqn Since being awarded a bar to the Distinguished Flying Cross, this officer has completed many sorties, including a daylight raid on Danzig and an attack at Gdynia. In the recent attack at Le Creusot, Wing-Commander Gibson bombed and machine-gunned the transformer station nearby from five hundred feet. On 22 October 1942, he participated in the attack on Genoa and, two days later, he led his squadron in a daylight sortie against Milan. On both occasions, Wing-Commander Gibson flew with great distinction. He is a most skilful and courageous leader whose keenness has set a most inspiring example.
Companion of the Distinguished Service Order and Bar (DSO*)	bar 1943	Bar to the Distinguished Service Order Acting Wg-Cdr G.P. Gibson, 106 Sqn This officer has an outstanding operational record, having completed 172 sorties. He has always displayed the greatest keenness and, within the past two months, has taken part in six attacks against well-defended targets, including Berlin. In March 1943, he captained an aircraft detailed to attack Stuttgart. On the outward flight engine trouble developed but he flew on to his objective and bombed it from a low level. This is typical of his outstanding determination to make every sortie a success. By his skilful leadership and contempt for danger, he has set an example which has inspired the squadron he commands.
Distinguished Flying Cross and Bar (DFC*)	1940	Distinguished Flying Cross Fg Off. G.P. Gibson, 83 Sqn.
Distinguished Flying Cross and Bar (DFC*)	bar 1941	Bar to the Distinguished Flying Cross Acting Sqn Ldr. G.P. Gibson, 29 Sqn This officer continues to show the utmost courage and devotion to duty. Since joining his present unit, Squadron Leader Gibson has destroyed three and damaged a fourth enemy aircraft. His skill was notably demonstrated when, one night in July 1941, he intercepted and destroyed a Heinkel III.
1939–45 Star (Note: The 1939–1945 Star is a military campaign medal instituted by the United Kingdom on 8 July 1943 for award to British and Commonwealth forces for service in the Second World War. Two clasps were instituted to be worn on the medal ribbon, Battle of Britain and Bomber Command.[)		
Air Crew Europe Star with Clasp (Note: The Air Crew Europe Star is a military campaign medal, instituted by the United Kingdom in May 1945 for award to British and Commonwealth air crews who participated in operational flights over Europe from bases in the United Kingdom during the Second World War.[)		
War Medal 1939–1945 (Note: The War Medal 1939–1945 is a campaign medal which was instituted by the United Kingdom on 16 August 1945, for award to citizens of the British Commonwealth who had served full-time in the Armed Forces or the Merchant Navy for at least 28 days between 3 September 1939 and 2 September 1945)		
Commander of the Legion of Merit	(United States) 1943	The KING has granted unrestricted permission for the wearing of the undermentioned decorations, conferred upon the officers indicated, in recognition of valuable services rendered in connection with the war: — CONFERRED BY THE PRESIDENT OF THE UNITED STATES OF AMERICA. Legion of Merit (Commander). Wing Commander Guy Penrose GIBSON, V.C., D.S.O., D.F.C. (39438), Reserve of Air Force Officers. – Air Ministry, 3 December 1943

== Sources ==
=== Books ===
- Bartlett, W. B. (2011). The Dam Busters: In the Words of the Bomber Crews. Amberley Publishing Limited. p. ~216. ISBN 978-1-4456-0966-9.
- Gibson, Guy (2005). Enemy Coast Ahead – Uncensored. Manchester: Crecy Publishing Limited. ISBN 0-859791-18-1.
- Gibson, Guy (2019). Enemy Coast Ahead. London: Greenhill Books. ISBN 9781784384906.
- Hastings, Max (2005). Warriors. London: Harper Collins.
- McKinstry, Leo (2010). Lancaster. John Murray Publishers. ISBN 978-0-7195-2363-2.
- Morris, Richard (1994). Guy Gibson. London: Viking, Penguin Group.
- Nichol, John (2015). After the Flood: What the Dambusters did next. London: William Collins. ISBN 978-0-00-810031-5.
- Ottaway, Susan (2009). Guy Gibson VC The Glorious Dambuster. Hampshire, London: Speedman Press. ISBN 978-0-9562176-0-8.
- Sweetman, John (2002). The Dambusters Raid. London: Cassell. ISBN 0-304-35173-3.
- Thompson, Sir Robert (1989). Make for the Hills: Memories of Far Eastern Wars. Pen and Sword. p. 36. ISBN 0-85052-761-9.

=== Newspapers ===
- "No. 34371". The London Gazette. 16 February 1937. p. 1086.
- "No. 34457". The London Gazette. 23 November 1937. p. 7352.
- "No. 34700". The London Gazette. 3 October 1939. p. 6659.
- "No. 34892". The London Gazette. 9 July 1940. p. 4177.
- "No. 34996". The London Gazette. 9 November 1940. p. 6633.
- "No. 35276". The London Gazette. 16 September 1941. p. 5360.
- "No. 35791". The London Gazette (2nd supplement). 17 November 1942. p. 5031.
- "No. 35963". The London Gazette (2nd supplement). 2 April 1943. p. 1518.
- "No. 36030". The London Gazette (Supplement). 28 May 1943. p. 2361.
- "No. 36271". The London Gazette (3rd supplement). 30 November 1943. p. 5284.

=== Journals ===
- Holmes, Lawrence (December 2004). "Guy Gibson and the Cornish Connection". Royal Observer Corps Association Newsletter (44). Archived from the original on 4 October 2011.

=== Websites ===
- "Wing Commander Guy Gibson VC DSO DFC, Desert Island Discs". BBC. 19 February 1944.
- "1 folio; CHAR 20/141B/180 (Image 199)". www.churchillarchive.com. 26 September 1944. — "This item is part of a larger file. Go to CHAR 20/141A-B for the other documents (items) in the file".
- "Casualty Details: Gibson, Guy Penrose". Commonwealth War Graves Commission.
- "GIBSON, Guy (1918–1944)". English Heritage. 2006.
- Guest, Russel; Goyat, Richard (10 February 2003). "O.K.L. Fighter Claims, Chef für Ausz. und Dizsiplin Luftwaffen-Personalamt L.p. [A] V Films & Supplementary Claims List. Reich, West and Südfront August–December 1944 Issue No. 1". lesliesawyer.com. Archived from the original on 8 August 2014.
- Johnson, Jonny (16 May 2019). "The Last Dambuster Recalls What It Was like under the Command of Guy Gibson". historyhit.com. History Hit.
- "The personal effects of Dambusters hero Wg Cdr Guy Gibson have gone on public display for the first time since his death on a combat mission in World War Two". RAF. 2012. Archived from the original on 19 October 2012.
- RAF Benevolent Fund (1 May 2018). "Wing Commander Guy Gibson". rafbf.org. RAF Benevolent Fund.

Military offices
New title	Commanding Officer of No. 617 Squadron; March–August 1943	Succeeded by G W Holden
