= Operation Garlic =

WWII air raid by the RAF

- Part of Second World War
- Eastern inlet of the Glane culvert in the Dortmund-Ems Canal (2026)
Date	14-16 September 1943
Location	Dortmund-Ems Canal 52°08′11.699″N 7°42′36.594″E

Belligerents
United Kingdom	(Nazi Germany) Germany

Commanders and leaders
(United Kingdom) Wg-Cdr G W Holden	(Nazi Germany) N/A

Strength
8 Lancasters, 6 Mosquitos on each raid	Flak Gun defences

Casualties and losses
6 aircraft destroyed	Little to no damage

Operation Garlic was an operation to attack the Dortmund-Ems Canal by No. 617 Squadron RAF carried out on 14-16 September 1943. The operation was unsuccessful as the canal was not significantly damaged by the attack, while 617 Squadron lost six of the nine aircraft and crews involved in the operation.

== Concept ==
The Dortmund-Ems Canal was a waterway vital to the war economy, making it a suitable target. It was believed that if several 12,000lb bombs were dropped on the two Glane culverts in the old and new canal branches west of Ladbergen at low level then they could be breached. The large bombs used had a poor aerodynamic design. To deliver them accurately they had to be dropped from a low level. For this reason, 617 Squadron was assigned the job of destroying the canal.

== Raid ==
The raid was undertaken by eight Avro Lancaster aircraft of 617 Squadron supported by six de Havilland Mosquito aircraft from 418 and 605 Squadrons. The raid was scheduled for the night of 14/15 September; however, the aircraft were recalled whilst over the North Sea due to fog and mist over the target. Whilst returning, Squadron Leader (S/Ldr) Maltby's aircraft hit the sea, possibly after colliding with a Mosquito which was returning from a different raid, and all the crew were killed. Flight Lieutenant (F/Lt) Shannon and his crew circled the wreckage site for two hours waiting for rescue. Maltby's body was the only one recovered.

The attack was re-launched on the night of the 15/16, with the same Lancasters involved, except that F/Lt Martin took the place of Maltby. The point of attack was north of Münster and west of Ladbergen where the canal divided into two branches. The attacking force was split into two groups with three Mosquitos for each four Lancasters, the main purpose of the Mosquitos being to defend the Lancasters from Flak. The visibility on the raid was reported to be very bad, preventing accurate location of the target.

Commander	Returned?	Notes
Wg-Cdr Holden	No	Raid leader. Shot down by flak.
S/Ldr Maltby	No	Deputy Force leader. Crashed on the first attack whilst returning.
F/Lt Knight	No	Aircraft was damaged due to hitting a tree. Was able to allow his crew to bail out; however, Knight was unable to land the aircraft and was killed.
F/Lt Wilson	No	Requested permission to attack; however, nothing further was heard from the aircraft.
F/Lt Allsebrook	No	Dropped load of bombs; however, contact could not be made shortly after.
P/O Divall	No	Heard over the R/T, dropped his bomb, then crashed.
F/Lt Shannon	Yes	Shannon dropped his bomb, which exploded over the Tow Path on the east bank.
F/Lt Martin	Yes	Bombed close to the canal. Took command over remaining aircraft after the rest went down.
P/O Rice	Yes	Could not identify the canal area due to poor visibility so returned.

All Mosquitos returned safely.

== Aftermath ==
The canal was eventually breached the following year. On the night of the 23/24 September 1944 aircraft of 617 Squadron attacked the canal using the more effective 12,000 lb Tallboy bomb, which had a seismic effect that breached the canal embankments. Further attacks followed. During the attack on 4/5 November 1944, the culvert in the Alte Fahrt (i.e. the old branch) was destroyed and not repaired. After every successful attack, shipping had to be suspended and the canal repaired by the Ladbergen Canal Authority. It was not until the attack on 3/4 March 1945 that the canal became unnavigable for the remainder of the war.
