= Les Knight =

Australian bomber pilot

Les Knight DSO
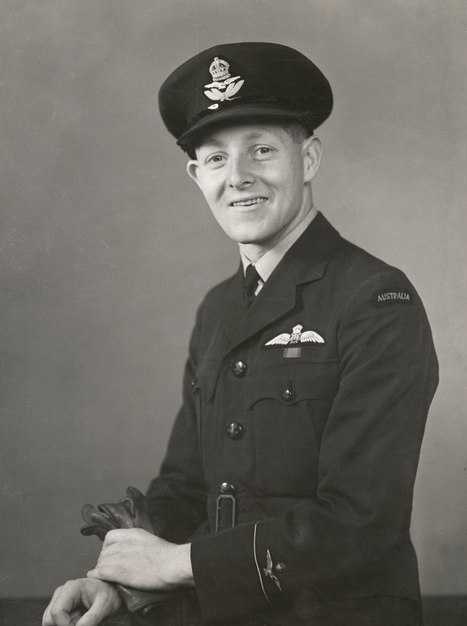
- Knight in June 1943
- Born: 7 March 1921; Camberwell, Australia
- Died: 16 September 1943 (aged 22); Den Ham, Netherlands
- Military career
- Allegiance: Australia
- Branch: Royal Australian Air Force
- Service years: 1941–1943
- Rank: Flight Lieutenant
- Unit: No. 617 Squadron RAF
- Conflicts: Second World War; Operation Chastise; Operation Garlic
- Awards: Distinguished Service Order; Mentioned in Despatches

Leslie Gordon Knight (7 March 1921 – 16 September 1943) was an Australian bomber pilot in the Royal Australian Air Force during the Second World War. He was awarded the Distinguished Service Order in 1943 for his role in Operation Chastise while flying with No. 617 Squadron RAF. Knight's crew, flying in N-Nan, attacked, hit and breached the Eder Dam, the second dam to be attacked, after his comrades had previously scored one hit and one miss.

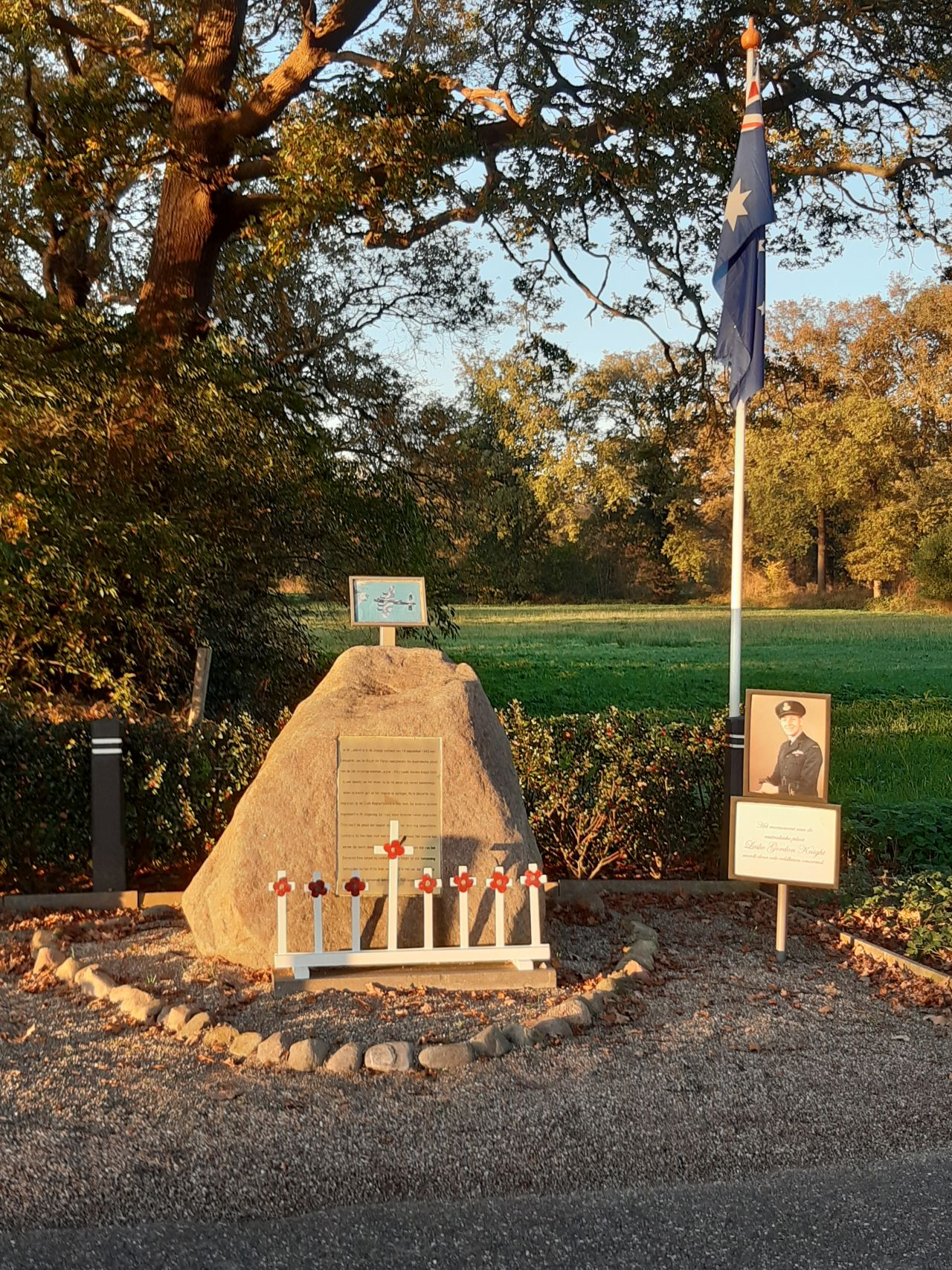
Monument for Leslie Gordon Knight, DSO, in Den Ham, The Netherlands

Knight was killed later the same year while taking part in Operation Garlic – the Dortmund–Ems Canal raid. After his Lancaster's engines were damaged by clipping a tree while flying at low level, he was able to allow his entire crew to bail out but was unable to land the aircraft without crashing. He is buried at Den Ham General Cemetery in the Netherlands. A monument was also erected at the crash site.

In the 1955 film The Dam Busters, Knight was played by Denys Graham.
