= Harold Martin (RAF officer) =

Royal Air Force Air Marshal (1918-1988)

Air Marshal Sir Harold Martin KCB DSO & Bar DFC & Two Bars AFC
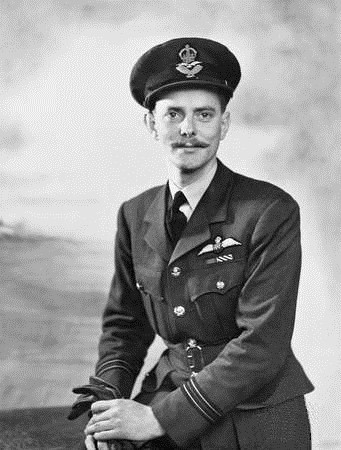
- Flight Lieutenant Micky Martin, June 1943
- Born: 27 February 1918; Edgecliff, Australia
- Died: 3 November 1988 (aged 70); London, England
- Military career
- Allegiance: United Kingdom
- Branch: Royal Air Force
- Service years: 1940–1974
- Rank: Air Marshal
- Nickname: Micky
- Units: No. 455 Squadron RAAF (1941–42); No. 50 Squadron RAF (1942); No. 515 Squadron RAF (1944)
- Commands: Air Member for Personnel (1973–74); Royal Air Force Germany (1970–73); No. 38 Group RAF (1967–70); RAF Nicosia (c.1960–62); No. 617 Squadron RAF (1943)
- Conflicts: Second World War; European theatre; Operation Chastise; Operation Garlic
- Awards: Knight Commander of the Order of the Bath; Distinguished Service Order & Bar; Distinguished Flying Cross & Two Bars; Air Force Cross
- Other work: Advisor, Hawker Siddeley

Air Marshal Sir Harold Brownlow Morgan "Micky" Martin, KCB, DSO & Bar, DFC & Two Bars, AFC (27 February 1918 – 3 November 1988) was an Australian bomber pilot and senior commander in the Royal Air Force (RAF). He took part in Operation Chastise, the RAF's "Dambusters" raid in 1943, and was described by journalist Sir Max Hastings as "one of the three great bomber pilots of the war". He rose to become a senior officer in the RAF, commanding RAF Germany and later serving as Air Member for Personnel, a member of the Air Council, the RAF's controlling body.

== Early life ==
Born on 27 February 1918 in Edgecliff, New South Wales, Martin left Australia for the United Kingdom in 1939. He intended to study medicine at the University of Edinburgh, but instead volunteered to join the Royal Air Force (RAF) on 28 August 1940.

== Military career ==
=== Second World War ===
Martin commenced his operational career with No. 455 Squadron RAAF in October 1941, flying the Handley Page Hampden. In February 1942, he captained the first all-Australian crewed bombing sortie against Germany. Martin soon acquired a reputation for low-level flying in order to avoid anti-aircraft fire and fighters. After 13 operations, he and his crew joined No. 50 Squadron RAF. Flying Hampdens, Avro Manchesters, and finally Avro Lancasters, they completed their tour in October 1942, Martin being awarded the Distinguished Flying Cross (DFC).

Martin's penchant for low flying contributed to his selection in March 1943 for assignment to the newly formed No. 617 Squadron under Wing Commander Guy Gibson. Martin took part in the "Dambusters" raid on the night of 16/17 May 1943. He piloted the Lancaster bomber AJ-P "Popsie" (officially known as AJ-P "Peter") in the first formation, which was assigned to attack the Möhne Dam in Western Germany. Martin's plane was hit by anti-aircraft fire during the attack, but he successfully accomplished the bombing run and returned. He was awarded a Distinguished Service Order (DSO) for his actions. Martin was considered one of the best pilots in the squadron and was known for his dry jokes and constant good humour that he exhibited at all times, even when he was under considerable pressure. He was portrayed by Bill Kerr in the 1955 film The Dambusters.

Following Gibson's retirement from operations and the immediate loss in action of his successor, Squadron Leader George Holden, Martin assumed temporary command of No. 617 Squadron. Later, under the command of Wing Commander Leonard Cheshire, Martin participated in various pin-point attacks on targets in France, Italy and Germany, often employing the new 12,000 lb (5,443 kg) Tallboy bomb as seen in Operation Garlic. In February 1944, during an attack on the Anthéor railway Viaduct in the French Riviera, Martin's Lancaster was hit by flak, knocking out the two port engines and killing the bomb aimer Bob Hay, while wounding another crew member. Martin could not make the return trip to England, and flew on south toward an RAF base at Corsica before diverting further to the United States Army Air Forces base at Elmas Field in Sardinia. The mission was Martin's 49th sortie flying a heavy bomber.

When Martin returned to England he was transferred out of No. 617 Squadron and placed in No. 100 Group's No. 515 Squadron, flying the de Havilland Mosquito on serrate night fighter missions in support of Bomber Command aircraft. By late 1944, Martin had flown another 34 operations, where he claimed two aircraft shot down, and three destroyed (and one damaged) on the ground.

=== Post-war ===
After the war, Martin attended a course at the RAF Staff College in Haifa and in 1945 joined the headquarters staff of No. 100 Group. He broke the speed record for flying from London to Cape Town, completing the 6,717 mile journey in a time of 21 hours, 31 minutes in a Mosquito, for which he won the Oswald Watt Gold Medal and the Britannia Trophy. In 1947 he flew the meteorological Mosquito for the first transatlantic jet crossing in support of No. 54 Squadron's de Havilland Vampires.

He was initially chosen to head up the Operation Ju-jitsu flights, which the RAF were performing on behalf of the US Government. The flights were top secret reconnaissance missions deep into the Soviet Union using American B-45 Tornado bombers. Unfortunately Martin failed a pressurisation test and the entire project was handed over to Squadron Leader John Crampton instead.

Martin was appointed to a succession of staff jobs: Air Attache, Tel Aviv in 1952; Operation Plans Division in 1955; attached to NATO in Fontainebleau, France 1955-1958; and Group Captain — Electronic Warfare, HQ Signals Command in 1959, before becoming Aide-de-camp to the Queen in 1964. He then served for three years from 1967 to 1970 as Air Officer Commanding No. 38 Group. In 1970 he was appointed Commander-in-Chief RAF Germany and finally, in 1973, Air Member for Personnel.

== Later life ==
After retiring from the RAF on 31 October 1974, Martin worked for aircraft manufacturer Hawker Siddeley as an advisor. Sir Harold Martin died at his home in London on 3 November 1988, and is buried at Gunnersbury Cemetery.

Military offices
Preceded by George Holden	Officer Commanding No. 617 Squadron; Acting; September – November 1943	Succeeded by Leonard Cheshire
Preceded by Peter Fletcher	Air Officer Commanding No. 38 Group; 1967–1970	Succeeded by Denis Crowley-Milling
Preceded by Christopher Foxley-Norris	Commander-in-Chief RAF Germany; Also Commander of the Second Tactical Air Force; 1970–1973	Succeeded by Nigel Maynard
Preceded by Sir Lewis Hodges	Air Member for Personnel; 1973–1974	Succeeded by Sir Neil Cameron
