= George Holden (RAF officer) =

British aviator and pilot in RAF Bomber Command during the Second World War

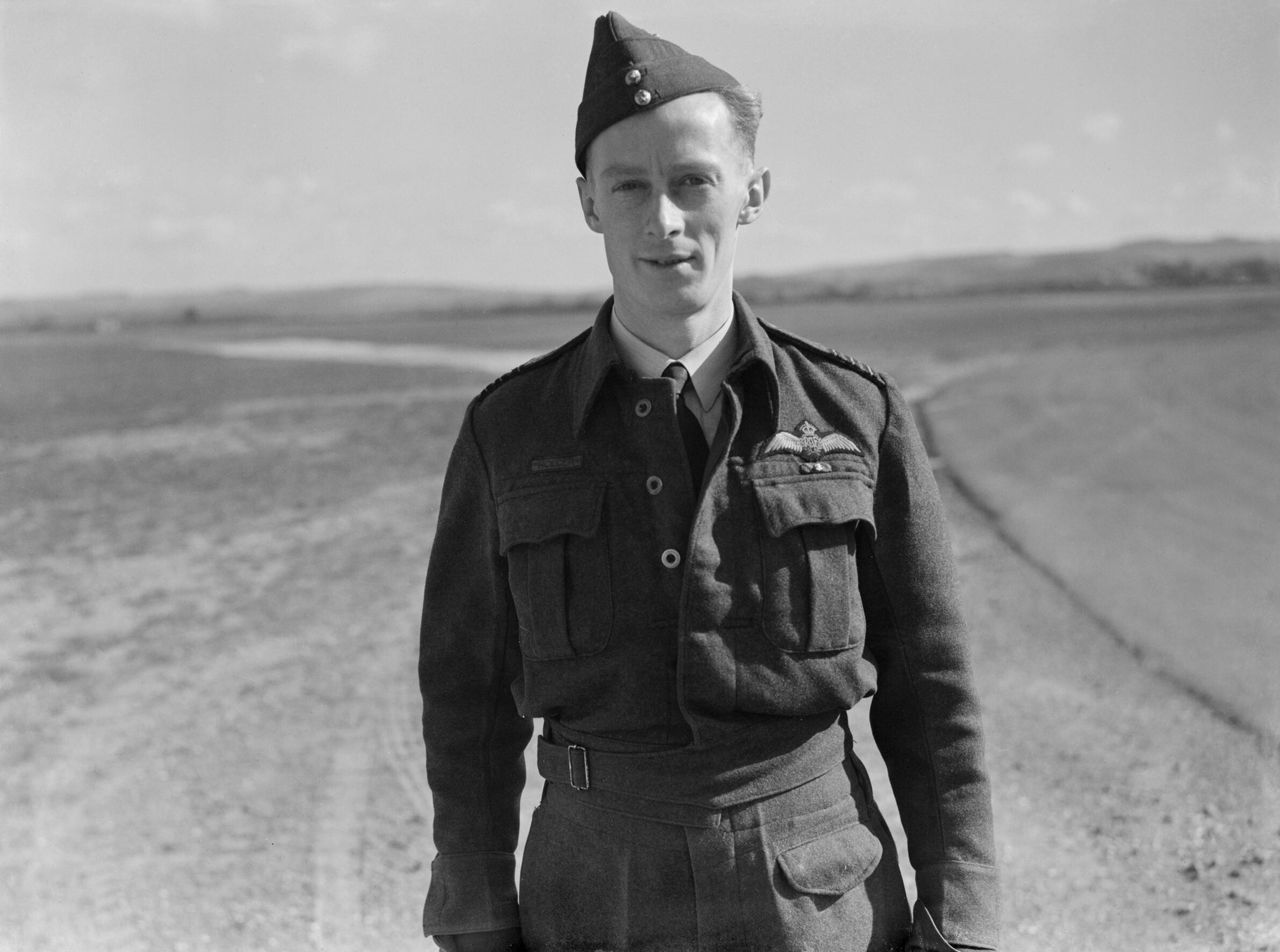
- Born: 1913; Oldham, England
- Died: 16 September 1943 (aged 29-30); Dortmund-Ems Canal, Nordhorn, Germany
- Burial place: Reichswald Forest War Cemetery, Germany
- Military career
- Allegiance: United Kingdom
- Branch: Royal Air Force
- Service years: 1934–1943
- Rank: Wing Commander
- Commands: No. 617 Squadron RAF
- Conflicts: Second World War: Operation Garlic †
- Awards: Distinguished Service Order; Distinguished Flying Cross & Bar; Mentioned in Despatches

Wing Commander George Walton Holden, DSO, DFC & Bar (1913 – 16 September 1943) was a British aviator and a pilot in RAF Bomber Command during the Second World War. He was briefly commander of No. 617 Squadron RAF—"The Dam Busters"—before his death.

== Biography ==
Born in 1913 in Oldham, he was the son of Frederick Charles Holden and Beatrice Holden. He was educated at Ashburton Grammar School, and enlisted in the Royal Air Force (RAF) in 1934.

Commissioned in 1941 with the service number 103484, Holden served with No. 102 Squadron RAF.

He was awarded a Distinguished Flying Cross (DFC) on 2 September 1941 while with No. 35 Squadron RAF and a Bar to his DFC on 12 February 1943. A Distinguished Service Order followed on 11 June 1943.

After the Dams raid, Guy Gibson was awarded the Victoria Cross and was retired from flying duties. Holden was brought in to command No. 617 Squadron RAF.

Holden only took part in 4 operations with No. 617 Squadron as he was killed during Operation Garlic, a failed raid on the Dortmund-Ems Canal. Four of Gibson's crew from Operation Chastise (Deering, Hutchison, Spafford and Taerum) were with Holden and all perished. He is buried in the Reichswald Forest War Cemetery in Germany.
