= Johnny Johnson (RAF officer) =

British Royal Air Force officer (1921–2022)

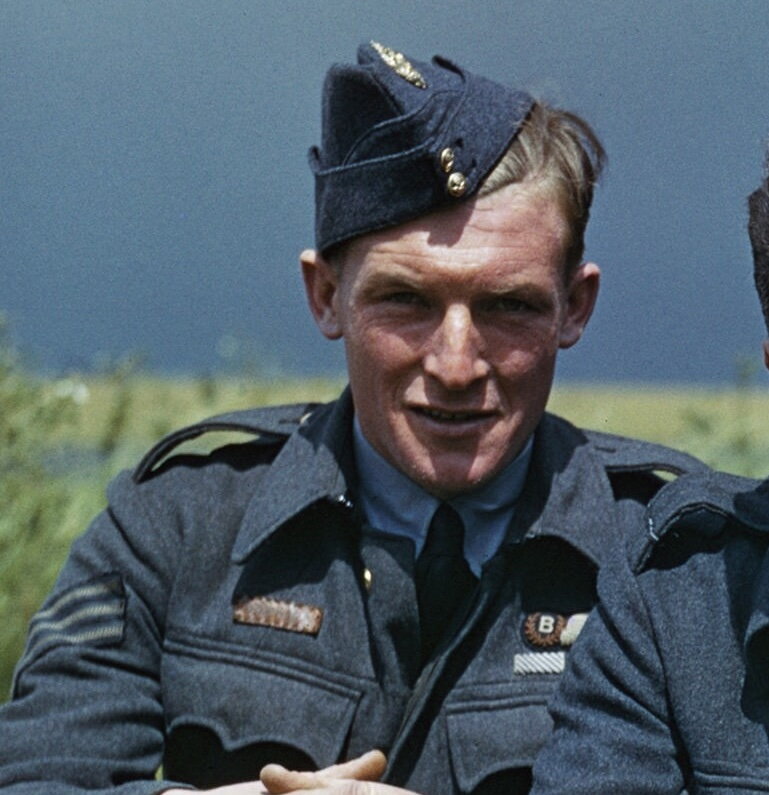
- Johnson in 1943
- Born: George Leonard Johnson; 25 November 1921; Hameringham, Lincolnshire, England
- Died: 7 December 2022 (aged 101); Westbury-on-Trym, Bristol, England
- Burial place: Torquay, Devon
- Spouse: Gwyneth Morgan (m. 1943; died 2005)
- Children: 3
- Military career
- Allegiance: United Kingdom
- Branch: Royal Air Force
- Service years: 1940–1962
- Rank: Squadron leader
- Units: No. 97 Squadron RAF; No. 617 Squadron RAF; No. 100 Squadron RAF; No. 120 Squadron RAF
- Conflicts: Second World War; European theatre; Operation Chastise
- Awards: Member of the Order of the British Empire; Distinguished Flying Medal

Squadron Leader George Leonard Johnson MBE DFM (25 November 1921 − 7 December 2022), better known as Johnny Johnson, was a British Royal Air Force officer who was the last surviving original member of No. 617 Squadron RAF and of Operation Chastise, the "Dambusters" raid of 1943.

== Early life and education ==
George Johnson (known within the family as Leonard) was the sixth and last child born to Mary Ellen (née Henfrey) and Charles Johnson. He was born in the village of Hameringham in the East Lindsey district of Lincolnshire, England. His mother died when he was three, leaving his father, a farm foreman, to bring up the family in somewhat poor conditions. Johnson grew up to loathe his father, whom he described as someone who would inflict severe corporal punishment on him. When Johnson's father died in 1957, he did not attend his funeral, a decision he stated he never regretted.

The family lived in a tied cottage in Langford, with his oldest sister Lena largely being responsible for his early upbringing. Johnson attended Winthorpe Primary School in the village of Winthorpe, Nottinghamshire until the age of 11. Through a bursary scheme set up for the children of agricultural workers, he was sent as a boarder to the Lord Wandsworth Agricultural College in Long Sutton, Hampshire. He was active in sport, playing football, cricket and participating in athletics, winning several events. He passed his School Certificate, leaving school in December 1939. During his lifetime he was held in particular affection by the school community.

== Royal Air Force ==
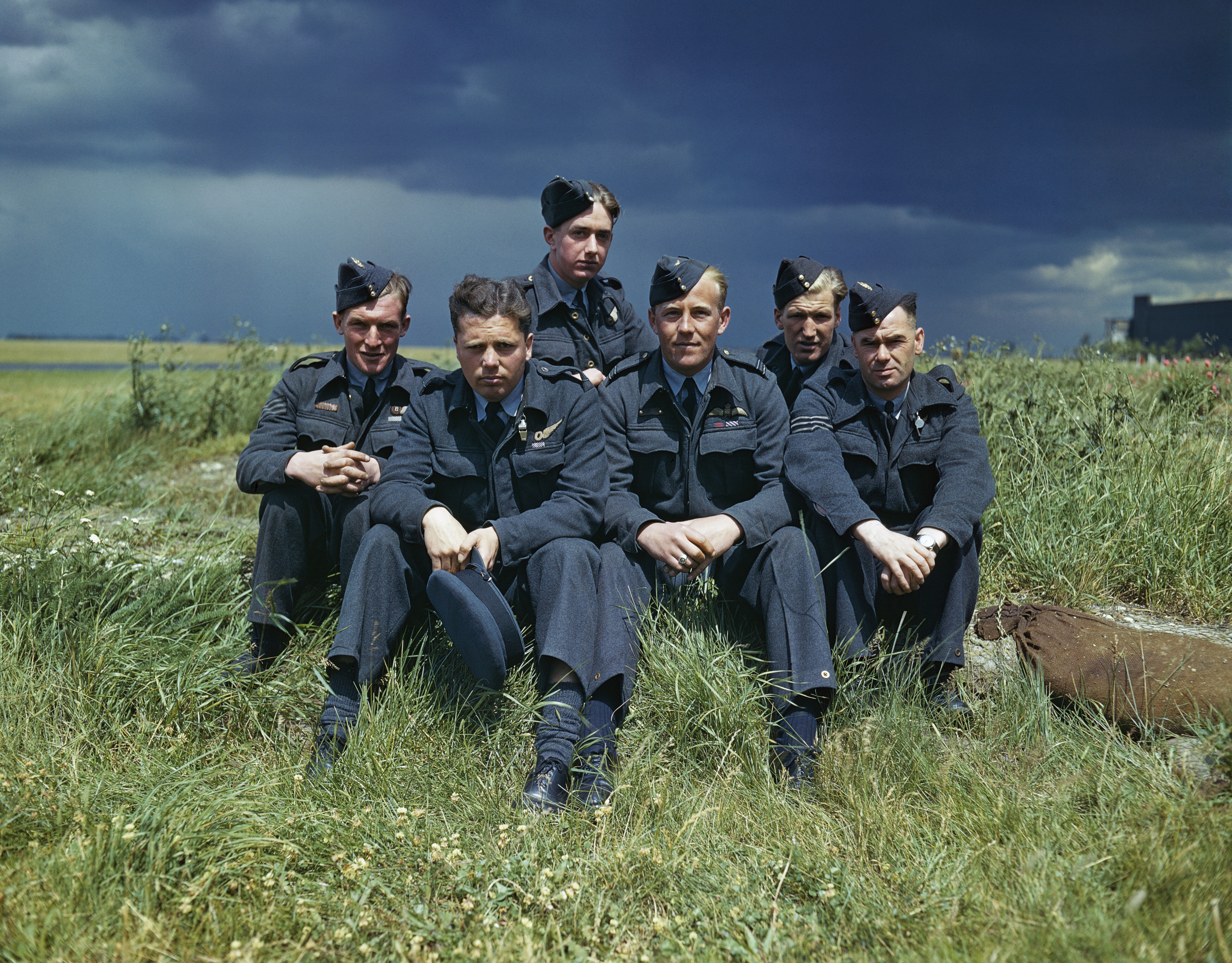
Johnson (far left) together with Joe McCarthy and the crew of Lancaster AJ-T pictured at RAF Scampton, 22 July 1943

Volunteering to join the Royal Air Force in 1940 as a navigator, Johnson was instead selected for pilot training. However, due to the difficulties in processing the vast numbers of recruits at the time, he was posted to various establishments around England. It was not until June 1941 that he was finally sent to Florida to begin his pilot training. As is common practice within the British armed forces, Johnson's surname led to him being nicknamed "Johnny".

Johnson did not make the required grade during his pilot training and as a consequence he opted to become an air gunner. In July 1942, Johnson was posted to No. 97 Squadron RAF at RAF Woodhall Spa where he was initially designated as a spare (reserve) gunner. This however gave him the opportunity to fly with numerous crews in the squadron, his first operational sortie being a raid on Gdynia in Poland on 27 August 1942, forming part of the crew under the command of Squadron Leader Elmer Cotton. En route to the target, the aircraft suffered an engine failure, forcing the pilot to abort the mission and return to Woodhall Spa. The following night, the crew were part of a successful raid on Nuremberg.

Johnson continued on squadron operations as an air gunner, until the opportunity came along for him to train as a specialist bomb aimer. Undergoing a course at RAF Fulbeck in November 1942, he returned to No. 97 Squadron filling the vacancy for a bomb aimer with the crew of Joe McCarthy. Initially, Johnson showed reticence in operating with an American skipper, however having met with McCarthy, he changed his mind.

Johnson's first sortie as part of McCarthy's crew was as part of a raid on Munich on 21 December 1942, conducted in bad weather. Attacked by night fighters on their way to and returning from the target, the Avro Lancaster lost all power on one engine and developed problems in another, forcing McCarthy to land at RAF Bottesford. Together with this crew, Johnson conducted a further 18 missions with No. 97 Squadron, bringing him to the end of a full operational tour, followed by a leave, after which he spent six months working in a non-combat training role.

=== Operation Chastise ===
Selected to be part of the specialist No. 617 Squadron RAF, Johnson arrived at RAF Scampton on 27 March 1943. It was at this time that he was due to marry; however, due to the requirements of the training for Operation Chastise, all leave had been cancelled. Johnson appealed to his new Commanding Officer, Wing Commander Guy Gibson, who eventually relented, giving Johnson four days' leave.

McCarthy's crew in Lancaster AJ-T (T-Tommy) were detailed to attack the Sorpe Dam, the structure of which differed considerably from the other main targets insofar as it being an earthen dam as opposed to the gravity construction of the Möhne and Eder dams, thus necessitating a completely different type of attack. Like the rest of No. 617 Squadron, Johnson had practised dropping his bomb as the aircraft flew straight towards the target at low level. However, on the afternoon prior to the raid, when the five crews detailed to attack the Sorpe Dam received their briefing, they were told that they had to fly along the dam wall and drop their mine at its centre. It would roll down the wall and explode when it reached the correct depth. The specialist bomb sight developed for the raid would also be of no use.

Due to various losses and technical issues en route to the target, AJ-T was the first Lancaster to reach the Sorpe, and McCarthy soon realised how difficult the attack would be. Although there were no flak batteries, the attack would require the aircraft to be flown low across the nearby town of Langscheid, with its prominent church steeple, followed by the aircraft having to drop even lower so the bomb could be released. It was not until the tenth attempt that the crew were satisfied, with Johnson finally releasing the bomb.

For his part in the raid, Johnson received the Distinguished Flying Medal. Along with other members of the squadron, he received his medal in an investiture at Buckingham Palace.

=== Subsequent operations ===
Following the Dams Raid, Johnson was commissioned in November 1943. As an integral part of McCarthy's crew, Johnson participated in a further 19 missions during his time with No. 617 Squadron until April 1944. By this time, his wife was pregnant, resulting in McCarthy insisting Johnson stand down. Reluctantly, this request was accepted, Johnson was "screened" (classed as "tour expired" or, in effect, due for a rest from operational flying). He was subsequently posted to a Heavy Conversion Unit back at RAF Scampton, where he became a bombing instructor until the end of hostilities.

At the end of the war, Johnson qualified as a navigator so he could receive a permanent commission. He joined No. 100 Squadron RAF operating the Avro Lincoln before transferring to RAF Coastal Command, where he served with No. 120 Squadron RAF operating the Avro Shackleton. This was followed by a tour in the Far East, before he returned to the UK.

Johnson was promoted to flight lieutenant on 7 September 1948. He continued in the RAF until 1962, retiring with the rank of Squadron Leader.

== Post-military career ==
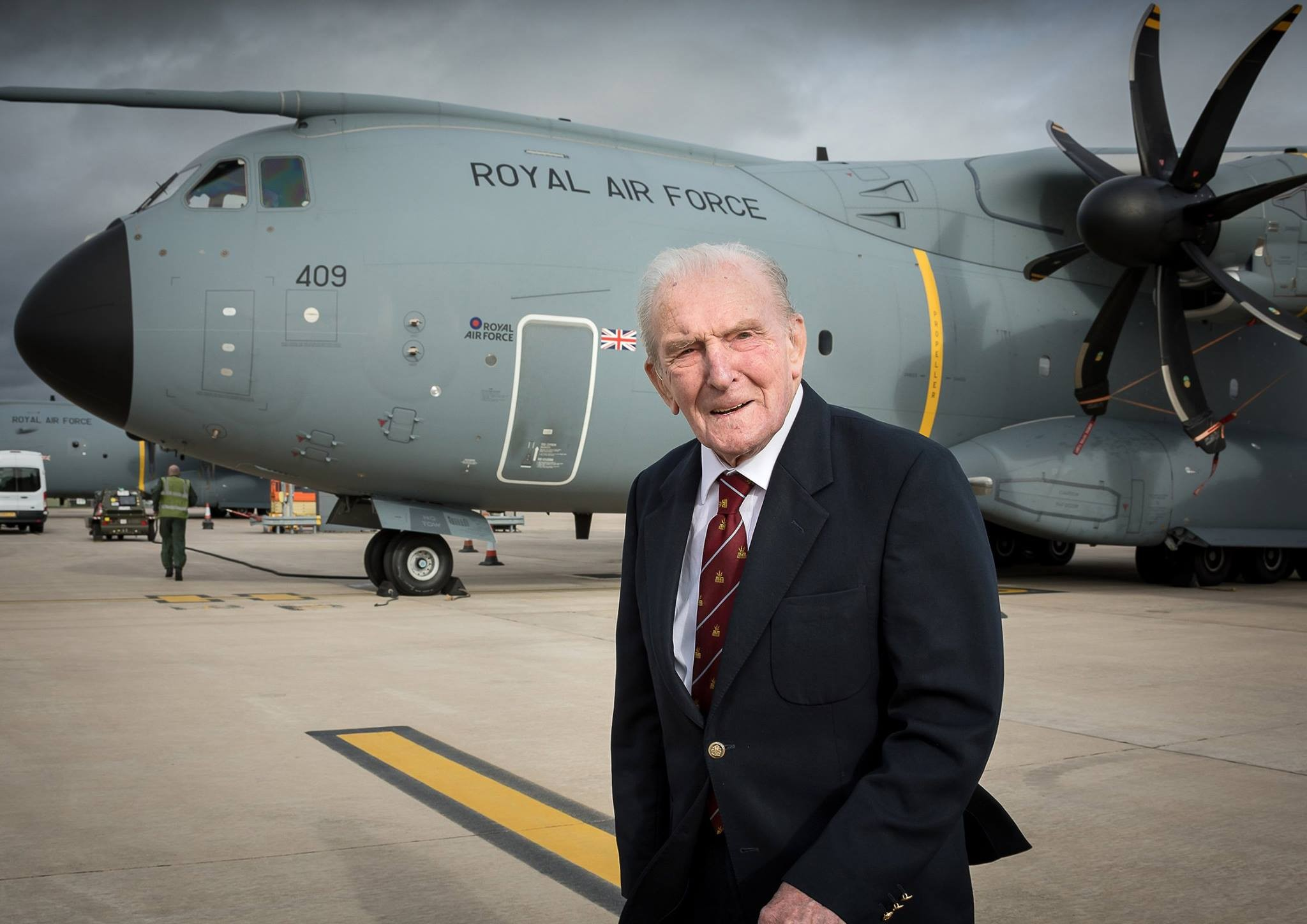
Johnson on a visit to an RAF air base in later life

Following his career in the RAF, Johnson became a teacher. He initially taught in primary schools, subsequently becoming involved in adult education before he undertook a period in teaching psychiatric patients at Rampton Hospital.

On his retirement, Johnson and his wife moved to Torquay, where they both became active in local politics. A member of the Conservative Party, Johnson became a local councillor and went on to become the chairman of the constituency party.

== Personal life ==
Johnson married Gwyneth Morgan in April 1943, having met her during a posting to Torquay in 1941. Together they had three children, the marriage lasting until Gwyneth's death in August 2005.

For a short time following his wife's death, Johnson decided to withdraw from public life. However, alongside Les Munro, he was at the forefront of the 70th anniversary commemorations of the Dams Raids in May 2013. He lived in Westbury on Trym, Bristol, and continued to give interviews on the various aspects of his active service and particularly concerning Operation Chastise. In 2015, he was awarded the Lord Mayor of Bristol's Medal.

Johnson's autobiography George "Johnny" Johnson, The Last British Dambuster was published in 2014.

Johnson was appointed a Member of the Order of the British Empire (MBE) in the 2017 Birthday Honours for services to Second World War remembrance and the community in Bristol. The award followed shortly after an unsuccessful petition for Johnson to be knighted was initiated by Carol Vorderman, which garnered over 200,000 signatures within a few weeks. The 237,000 signature petition was handed in to 10 Downing Street on 26 January 2017 by Vorderman and former RAF officer John Nichol.

On 7 September 2017, Johnson received an honorary doctorate from the University of Lincoln for his contribution to British society, and two months later, on 7 November, was presented his MBE by Queen Elizabeth II in a ceremony at Buckingham Palace.

On 7 November 2017, Johnson was given an Honorary Life Membership to the Royal Air Force Club in Piccadilly, London.

On 22 June 2018, Johnson was honoured by having a train named after him. Following the death of his wartime colleague Fred Sutherland, on 21 January 2019, Johnson became the last survivor of the original flying members of 617 Squadron.

On 25 November 2021, Johnson celebrated his 100th birthday, an occasion that was widely covered by the UK regional and national media.

Johnson died on 7 December 2022 at his care home in Westbury-on-Trym, Bristol, at the age of 101.
