= Against the Wind =

Against the Wind may refer to:

- Against the Wind (album), a 1980 album by Bob Seger
  - "Against the Wind" (Bob Seger song)
- "Against the Wind" (Bonnie Tyler song), 1991
- "Against the Wind" (Máire Brennan song), 1991
- Against the Wind (1948 film), a Ealing Studios World War II film
- Against the Wind (1990 film), a Spanish incest-themed drama film
- Against the Wind (2000 film), an Italian drama film
- Against the Wind (miniseries), a 1978 Australian television mini-series
  - Against the Wind (soundtrack), a soundtrack album from the series, by Jon English and Mario Millo
- "Against the Wind", an episode of 2011 animated Italian-German TV series Mia and Me

== See also ==
- Into the Wind (disambiguation)
