= Henry Eric Maudslay =

RAF bomber pilot

Squadron Leader Henry Eric Maudslay DFC
- Born: 21 July 1921; Leamington Spa, England
- Died: 17 May 1943 (aged 21) near Emmerich am Rhein, Nazi Germany
- Burial place: Reichswald Forest War Cemetery
- Military career
- Allegiance: United Kingdom
- Branch: Royal Air Force
- Service years: 1940 - 1943
- Rank: Squadron Leader
- Service number: 62275
- Unit: 617 Squadron
- Conflicts: Second World War: Operation Chastise †
- Awards: Distinguished Flying Cross

Henry Eric Maudslay, DFC (21 July 1921 – 17 May 1943) was a pilot with No. 617 Squadron of the Royal Air Force (RAF). He was killed in action while taking part in Operation Chastise, popularly known as the 'Dam Busters' raid.

== Early life ==
Henry Eric Maudslay was born on 21 July 1921 at 1 Vicarage Road, Leamington Spa, to Reginald Maudslay (a British engineer and car manufacturer) and his wife Gwendolen.

For his education, he first attended Beaudesert School, a preparatory school at Minchinhampton in Gloucestershire. From there, he went on to Eton College where he represented the school at athletics and rowing. In rowing Maudslay was made the school Captain of the Boats in 1940 and he won the six mile cross country run for Eton in 35 minutes and 40 seconds. He also had success in the steeplechase, the one mile and the half mile.

== Military service ==
=== 1940-43 ===
Maudslay had planned to join the Royal Air Force as an officer cadet at RAF Cranwell. However, the outbreak of the Second World War led to his volunteering in May 1940.

After pilot training in Canada, as part of the Commonwealth joint air plan, he returned to Britain in February 1941 and was posted to 44 Squadron at RAF Waddington.

He flew 29 operations in this period and was awarded a Distinguished Flying Cross for an attack on two cargo ships with the cloud base dropping to 300 feet.

In December 1941, he and other members of the squadron were sent to RAF Boscombe Down. There he participated in service trials and other work on the new heavy bomber, the Avro Lancaster.

Maudslay carried out training assignments till his return to combat operations at RAF Skellingthorpe with 50 Squadron on 1 January 1943. He then moved with his crew to join 617 Squadron at RAF Scampton, although not all would fly with him on the Dams raid.

=== 617 Squadron ===
On 25 March 1943, Maudslay and his crew moved to join their new squadron RAF Scampton.

He wrote to his mother:

My Wing Commander here tells me that they are making me a Squadron Leader and giving me a Flight but please don't take this too seriously yet - I'm not anyway.

==== Operation Chastise ====
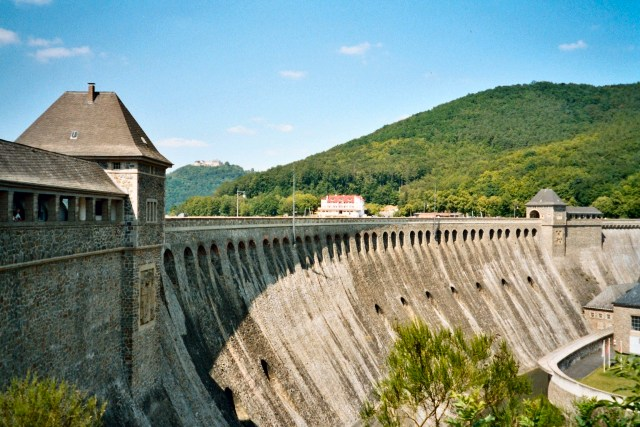
A view of the Edersee Dam, Germany.

On the night of 17 May 1943, Maudslay flew as commander of B Flight in his Lancaster, call sign Z-Zebra, against the Eder Dam. The geography made the approach difficult with he and comrade Dave Shannon making several approaches.

When Z-Zebra's Upkeep bouncing bomb was dropped it struck the dam's parapet. It is believed that the resulting explosion damaged the aircraft. A red Very light was fired from Z-Zebra and the Squadron Leader, Guy Gibson, called out to Maudslay asking "Are you ok?" To which the faint signal came in reply, "I think so. Stand by..." which was the last known voice contact with the aircraft.

The aircraft was hit by anti-aircraft fire at Emmerich before crashing near Klein-Netterden with the loss of the entire crew.

Gibson wrote of Maudslay:

Henry, was a born leader... a great loss, but he gave his life for a cause for which men should be proud. Boys like Henry are the cream of our youth. They die bravely and they die young.

— Guy Gibson, Enemy Coast Ahead

Maudslay was initially buried at Düsseldorf North Cemetery before being reburied at Reichswald Forest War Cemetery on 3 October 1946. There he rests in the care of the Commonwealth War Graves Commission.

His grave stone carries the inscription, "He died gloriously in the breaching of the Eder Dam."

A tribute was paid in The Times by someone writing under the initials J. D. H.:

He was always the same, at his mother's lovely home in the Cotswolds, with a crowd of Eton friends, or walking in the country with a single companion, courteous, cheerful, loyal, sincere. With his many friends and admirers, old and young alike, his memory will never die. It will be an ever fresh inspiration to aim at the highest and best in life.

— J. D. H., The Times, 1 September 1943

== In popular culture ==
Maudslay was portrayed in the 1955 feature film 'The Dam Busters' by Richard Thorp.
