= John Vere Hopgood =

British Royal Air Force pilot (1921–1943)

Flight Lieutenant John Vere Hopgood DFC & Bar
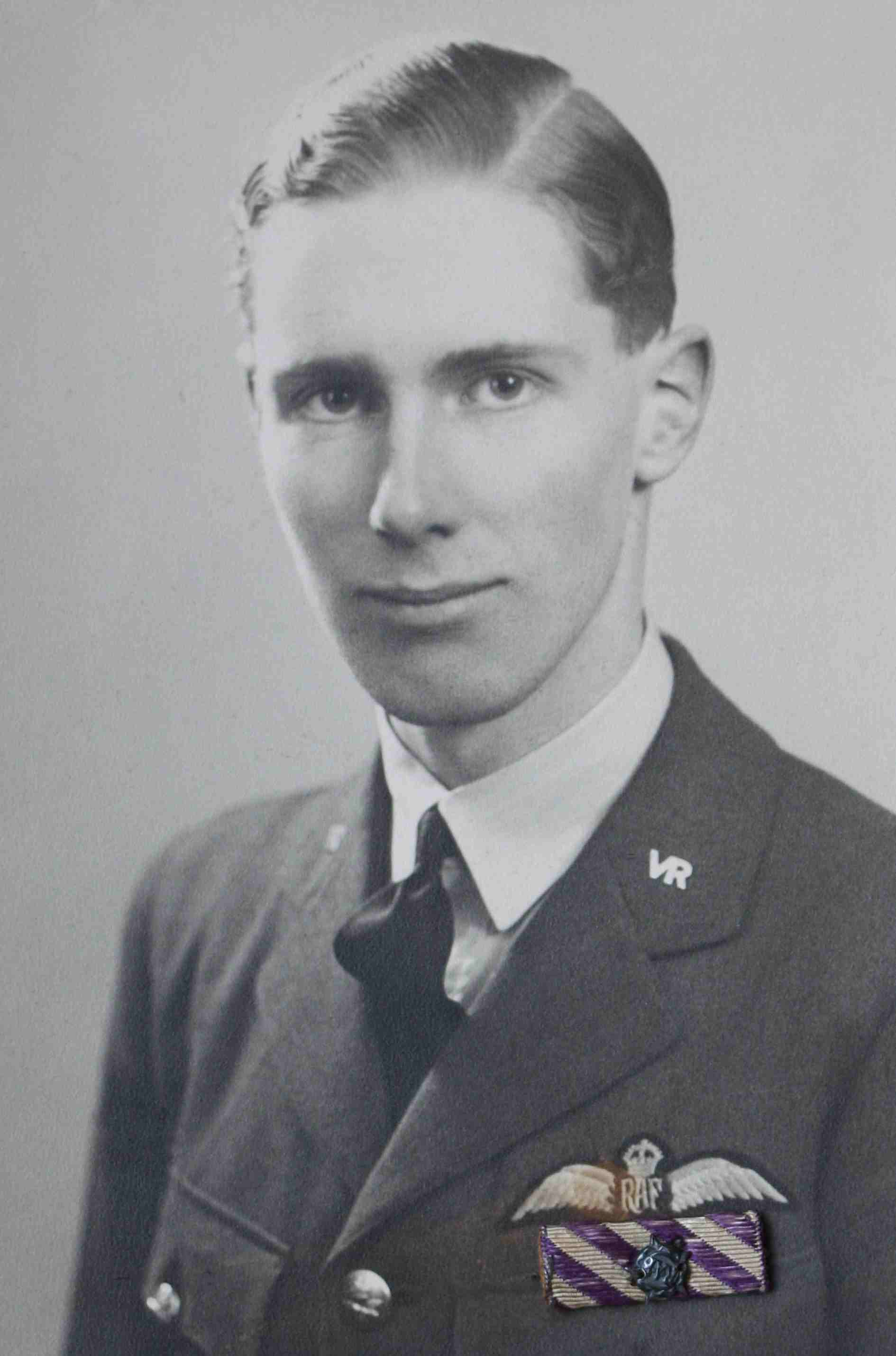
- John Vere Hopgood
- Born: 29 August 1921; Hurst, Berkshire, England
- Died: 17 May 1943 (aged 21) near Mohnesee, Nazi Germany
- Burial place: Rheinberg War Cemetery
- Military career
- Allegiance: United Kingdom
- Branch: Royal Air Force Volunteer Reserve
- Service years: 1940–1943
- Rank: Flight Lieutenant
- Nickname: "Hoppy"
- Service number: 61281
- Units: No. 50 Squadron RAF; No. 106 Squadron RAF; No. 617 Squadron RAF
- Conflicts: Second World War: Operation Chastise †
- Awards: Distinguished Flying Cross & Bar

John Vere Hopgood, DFC & Bar (29 August 1921 – 17 May 1943) was a pilot with No. 617 Squadron of the Royal Air Force (RAF). He was killed in action while taking part in Operation Chastise, popularly known as the 'Dam Busters' raid.

== Early life ==
John Hopgood was born on 29 August 1921 in Hurst, Berkshire, to solicitor Harold Hopgood and his second wife Grace. Harold's first wife Beatrice had died in 1918. John was the middle of three children from this second marriage (in addition to a half brother and sister from the first) and was educated at Marlborough College.

Hopgood's younger sister Elizabeth Bell recalled John as a child:

I can remember him as a little boy, sort of getting in a panic over things. As a small child, he used to cry a lot... But when he got into the RAF it was incredible how he managed to control it... He found his feet in the RAF.

— Elizabeth Bell

Hopgood was due to go up to the University of Cambridge and study at Corpus Christi College but the outbreak of the Second World War intervened in these plans.

== Second World War ==
Hopgood joined the Royal Air Force Volunteer Reserve in 1940, qualified as a pilot in February 1941 and earned his commission in 1942 when he was promoted to flight lieutenant. October 1942 saw him awarded the Distinguished Flying Cross after completing 47 operations, and a Bar to the award in January 1943. His initial service was with No. 50 Squadron, where he completed his first tour before being posted to a training unit. While in service with No. 106 Squadron, Hopgood participated in the air raid on Gdynia in August 1942 and the daylight raid on Le Creusot in October of the same year. It was during the Le Creusot raid that he made a low level attack on an electrical transformer station from 500 feet.

The new Commanding Officer of No. 106 Squadron, Guy Gibson, arrived in April 1942 and recorded his first thoughts on Hopgood in his book 'Enemy Coast Ahead':

He was a fair-haired chap about medium height, rather good-looking, except for one prominent tooth. The boys seemed to be always taking him off about this, but he took it very good-naturedly. He was a serious fellow at heart, though, even though he spent most of his time with the boys. As soon as I saw him I thought, 'What an ideal squadron type. I like that chap'.

— Guy Gibson, Enemy Coast Ahead

Of his service with 106 Squadron, Gibson wrote in Hopgood's flight logbook;

A very fine operational tour. This officer has pressed home his attacks with great determination and he has shown himself to be one of the most outstanding captains of No. 5 Group.

=== Dambusters Raid ===
Gibson selected Hopgood as his deputy for the attack against the Möhne Dam. While awaiting take off Hopgood spoke with Dave Shannon, telling him that he had had a premonition that he would not survive the mission. Gibson responded to the premonition with, "Hoppy, tonight's the night; tomorrow we will get drunk".

Hopgood took off in the first group alongside Gibson and Mick Martin. It was on the journey to the Möhne that Hopgood's aircraft AJ-M (M Mother) was hit by flak while passing the airfield at Dülmen. Hopgood along with gunners George Gregory and Tony Burcher were injured but they continued the attack. There is a possibility that Gregory was killed by flak at this point.

The damaged aircraft reached the dam where they attacked at 00:32, ten minutes after Gibson. However, they were struck again by anti-aircraft fire and their bomb was released too late. It bounced over the dam and exploded on a power station on the other side.

In a 1984 interview with the Imperial War Museum, David Shannon, who also took part in the raid described the loss of Hopgood's aircraft-

...his wing on the starboard side had caught fire, and I think his bomb aimer must have been hit because the bomb was released late and bounced over the wall and there was a tremendous explosion. Hopgood did his best to gain height and he gained I suppose four or five hundred feet when the entire aircraft exploded in mid-air beyond the dam wall in a steep climb…

The aircraft was fatally damaged and Hopgood remained at the controls, gaining height to allow his crew to bail out. Rear gunner, Pilot Officer Tony Burcher, remembered hearing Hopgood say; "Get out you damn fool. If only I could get another 300 ft. I can't get any more height". Pilot Officer John Fraser (Bomb-aimer) and Tony Burcher jumped and were made prisoners of war. However, the already injured Sergeant John Minchin (Wireless Operator) who also bailed out did not survive. AJ-M crashed in a field near Ostönnen, 6 kilometres (3.72 miles) from the dam. The bodies of Hopgood, Brennan, Navigator Kenneth (Ken) Earnshaw from Bridlington and Gregory were found inside.

Hopgood is buried at the Rheinberg War Cemetery (Coll. grave 17. E. 2-6).

== Popular culture ==
Hopgood was portrayed in the 1955 feature film The Dam Busters by the actor John Fraser.
