= Les Munro =

New Zealand air force squadron leader

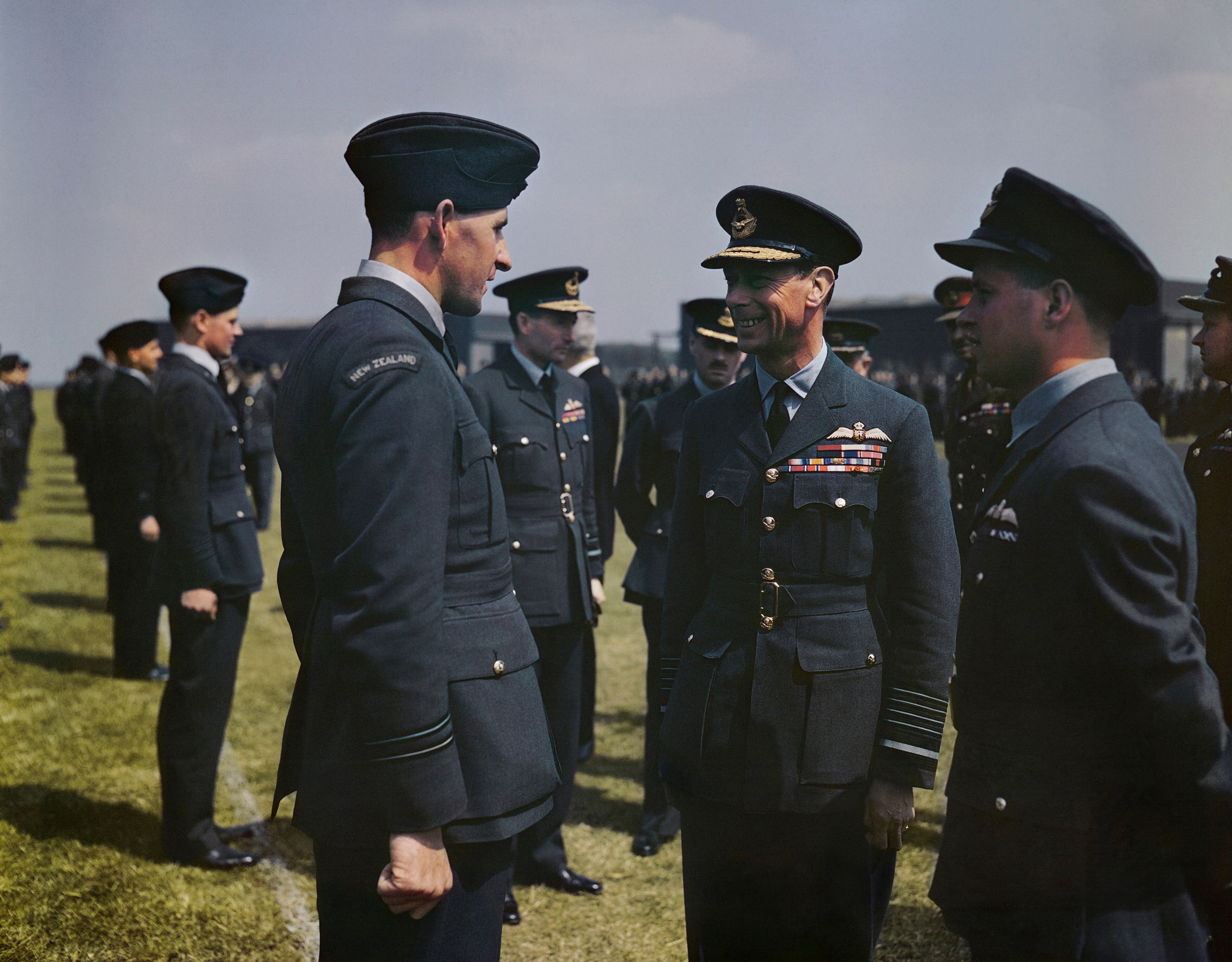
- Flight Lieutenant Les Munro (left foreground) speaking to King George VI (centre) and Wing Commander Guy Gibson (right) on 27 May 1943
- Born: 5 April 1919; Gisborne, New Zealand
- Died: 4 August 2015 (aged 96); Tauranga, New Zealand
- Military career
- Allegiance: New Zealand
- Branch: Royal New Zealand Air Force
- Rank: Squadron Leader
- Conflicts: World War II; Operation Chastise
- Awards: Companion of the New Zealand Order of Merit; Distinguished Service Order; Companion of the Queen's Service Order; Distinguished Flying Cross; Legion of Honour (France)

Squadron Leader John Leslie Munro, CNZM, DSO, QSO, DFC, JP (5 April 1919 – 4 August 2015) was a Royal New Zealand Air Force pilot during World War II and the last surviving pilot of the Dambusters Raid of May 1943.

== Early life ==
Born on 5 April 1919 near Gisborne on New Zealand's East Coast, Munro lived there until he enlisted in the Royal New Zealand Air Force on 5 July 1941. He was originally turned down because of unsatisfactory scholastic ability, but studied by correspondence and was finally accepted.

His father was from the woollen mills of Glasgow; at the turn of the century he contracted T.B. and emigrated to New Zealand. He was employed as a shepherd on the isolated Marshlands sheep station (farm) which was 5 miles from the nearest settlement and school and 16 miles from Gisborne. Money was scarce, so Les gave up high school; working on a dairy farm and then a mixed sheep and cropping farm. He had a younger sister and brother; Ian joined the Army in 1940. But Les wanted to be a pilot not aircrew, so he took a correspondence course in mathematics to qualify. He was accepted for the Empire Air Training Scheme and left for advanced training in Canada in October 1941. Being conservative he chose to be a bomber pilot though being a fighter pilot was more popular.

== Military career ==
Munro learned to fly in Tiger Moths at the RNZAF's Flying Training School at Bell Block near New Plymouth, and on graduation chose to fly bombers so was posted to Canada for initial bomber training. He trained on twin-engine aircraft in Saskatchewan at RCAF Station Saskatoon, the present-day John G. Diefenbaker International Airport in Canada. He moved to England in October 1941 for further training, and joined 97 Squadron at Woodhall Spa in Lincolnshire. There, he flew Avro Manchesters and then Avro Lancasters in 1942/43 and while there his Distinguished Flying Cross was gazetted, on 11 June 1943.

On 25 March 1943, Munro, along with Flight Lieutenant Joe McCarthy and Squadron Leader David Maltby, were transferred to 617 Squadron to be part of the secretive Dambusters raid forming at RAF Scampton. The squadron was created to attack the dams of the Ruhr in an effort to wreck the industrial capacity of Germany. It was initially called Squadron "X", as the speed of its formation outstripped the RAF process for naming squadrons. Twenty-one bomber crews were selected from existing squadrons in 5 Group. These crews included RAF personnel of several different nationalities, as well as members of the Royal Australian Air Force (RAAF), Royal Canadian Air Force (RCAF) and Royal New Zealand Air Force (RNZAF), who were frequently attached to RAF squadrons under the Empire Air Training Scheme. Munro (the only RNZAF pilot in the squadron) took part in the Upkeep trials on 12 May; flying ED921. In Operation Chastise Munro was in Wave 2 in ED921 W.

Of the 19 Lancasters that flew on that full-moon night, only 11 returned. Munro, as pilot of W-Willie, was scheduled to bomb the Sorpe dam. Over the Netherlands, his aircraft was damaged by flak which knocked out all communications, so it turned back to land in Lincolnshire, still carrying its mine. His Distinguished Service Order was awarded while he was with 617, on 28 March 1943.

Munro was promoted to squadron leader on 14 February 1944 and was posted to command 1690 BDTF Squadron (Bomber Defence Training Flight) on 13 July 1944. His logbook shows that when departing Scampton to bomb Bremen with four 500 lb general-purpose bombs, his aircraft crashed and burned shortly after takeoff, but the crew escaped.

Munro took part in Operation Taxable in conjunction with the D Day landings in Normandy in which the Lancasters flew precise, elongated circuits dropping Window (aluminium strips), to convince German radar installations that a huge flotilla of ships was approaching Cap d'Antifer. The ruse was successful and the last of No. 617 Squadron Window droppers witnessed German shore batteries firing on the "Ghost" convoy.

Munro described the operation in his logbook as:

The creation of a tactical surprise to support the landing of troops on the opening of the second front. The most hazardous, difficult and most dangerous operation ever undertaken in the history of air warfare. Involved flying within at least nine miles of the enemy coast without fighter cover, and in conditions of bright moonlight and at a height of not more than 3000 ft (three thousand) at which the aircraft was open to attack by the deadliest of all weapons – light flak.

Munro's co-pilot on this operation was Wing Commander Leonard Cheshire, the squadron's commanding officer who later was awarded the Victoria Cross. When Cheshire was stood down, Cochrane also stood down 617's three flight commanders Dave Shannon from Australia, Joe McCarthy from Canada, and Les Munro. Munro was "not happy" as he had flown 59 ops and said:

I would have preferred the round figure of sixty ops. I never thought it would have been pressing my luck to go on. I don't think any of us did. We were all very close-knit and ran a very efficient operation during the Cheshire era. He exuded confidence in his own abilities, in flying, in operations and running the squadron, and that skill and professionalism filtered down to all of us.

So Munro was released from the Royal Air Force on 5 February 1946, and retired from flying. He was known (sarcastically) as "Happy" or "Smiler" because he was famed for his dour demeanour.

In a 2006 interview, Munro said of his war experiences that he "...would be the first to admit that I was pretty lucky. Most blokes who survived even a couple of operational tours would say that luck was on their side."

== Later life ==
Following his career in the military, Munro returned to New Zealand where he worked as a property valuer for a time and then on farms in the King Country before establishing his own farm near Te Kūiti. For some time he was involved in local politics as a councillor, and served as Mayor of Waitomo District Council from 1978 to 1995. On retirement, he moved to live in Tauranga. Munro continued to fly aircraft into his 90s. In the 1991 Queen's Birthday Honours, he was made a Companion of the Queen's Service Order for public services, and in the 1997 Queen's Birthday Honours, he was appointed a Companion of the New Zealand Order of Merit, for services to local government and the community.

Munro attended the 60th Anniversary commemoration of the Dambusters raid, along with the Queen and the Duke of Edinburgh in May 2003 at RAF Lossiemouth. He was also present, along with Richard Todd, the actor who played Wing Commander Guy Gibson in the 1955 The Dam Busters film, for the 65th anniversary commemoration held at Derwent Reservoir (Derbyshire) on 16 May 2008. As the last living pilot of the strike team, Munro joined the production crew in Masterton as technical adviser on a remake of the film.

Munro's signature was appended to two sets of souvenir first day covers issued in Britain to commemorate the 65th anniversary of Operation Chastise. One, postmarked "Scampton, 17th May 2008", was signed by the six surviving crew members who flew on the raid, and the other, postmarked 617 squadron, Scampton was signed by Munro alone. In 2009, Munro took part in filming for the documentary Into the Wind, directed by Steven Hatton. The film, a feature-length documentary about the veterans of Bomber Command, was released on 30 November 2011. He has a street named in Te Kuiti, Les Munro Place.

In 2014, his portrait was painted by Richard Stone, an artist famous for his paintings of royals, including Queen Elizabeth II and the Queen Mother. In March 2015, Munro intended to sell his war medals and flight logbook at auction to raise funds for the upkeep of the RAF Bomber Command Memorial in London. The auction was withdrawn after Lord Ashcroft donated £75,000 to the Royal Air Force Benevolent Fund towards the upkeep, with a further NZ$19,500 donated by the Museum of Transport and Technology in Auckland, where the medals will go on display. On 14 April 2015, he was one of eight New Zealand servicemen who were awarded the Legion of Honour by the French Ambassador to New Zealand.

The Dambusters pilot withdrew his war medals from auction, and agreed to give them to a museum in exchange for philanthropist's donations. Les Munro accepted the offer of British philanthropist Lord Ashcroft to donate $150,000 to assist in the upkeep of the Bomber Command Memorial in London and gave the medals to Auckland's Museum of Transport and Technology (MOTAT). Andrew Howard Barnes also set up a fund and donated an initial $30,000 to help preserve the historical legacy of Bomber Command in New Zealand. The fund was opened to donation from all New Zealanders.

Munro died on 4 August 2015 in hospital at Tauranga, New Zealand, at the age of 96, after being ill with heart problems.
