= Into the Wind =

Into the Wind may refer to:

- Into the Wind, a 2010 Canadian–American film in ESPN's 30 for 30 documentary series
- Into the Wind (2012 film), British documentary
- Into the Wind (2022 film), Polish film
