= Into the Wind (2012 film) =

- Directed by: Steven Hatton
- Release date: 30 November 2012
- Country: United Kingdom

Into the Wind is a documentary directed by Steven Hatton. The documentary features the contributions of RAF Bomber Command aircrew from the Second World War. The film features veterans from across the Commonwealth including veterans from Australia, Canada, Guyana, New Zealand, Poland, Trinidad and United Kingdom. The film focuses on the personal experiences of veterans.

The production team interviewed over 50 veterans during the interview process. Veterans include Les Munro, the last surviving Dams Raid (Operation Chastise) pilot; Cy Grant Guyanese actor, activist and singer; and the aviator Ken Wallis. Wallis, an aviator with over 70 years flying experience takes to the air for several sequences during the film flying one of his many autogyro designs.

The film, shot in high definition, is due for release in 2012. The film features many veterans who have never before spoken of their experiences on film.
