= Operation Chastise =

1943 attack on German dams by Royal Air Force

- Part of the Second World War
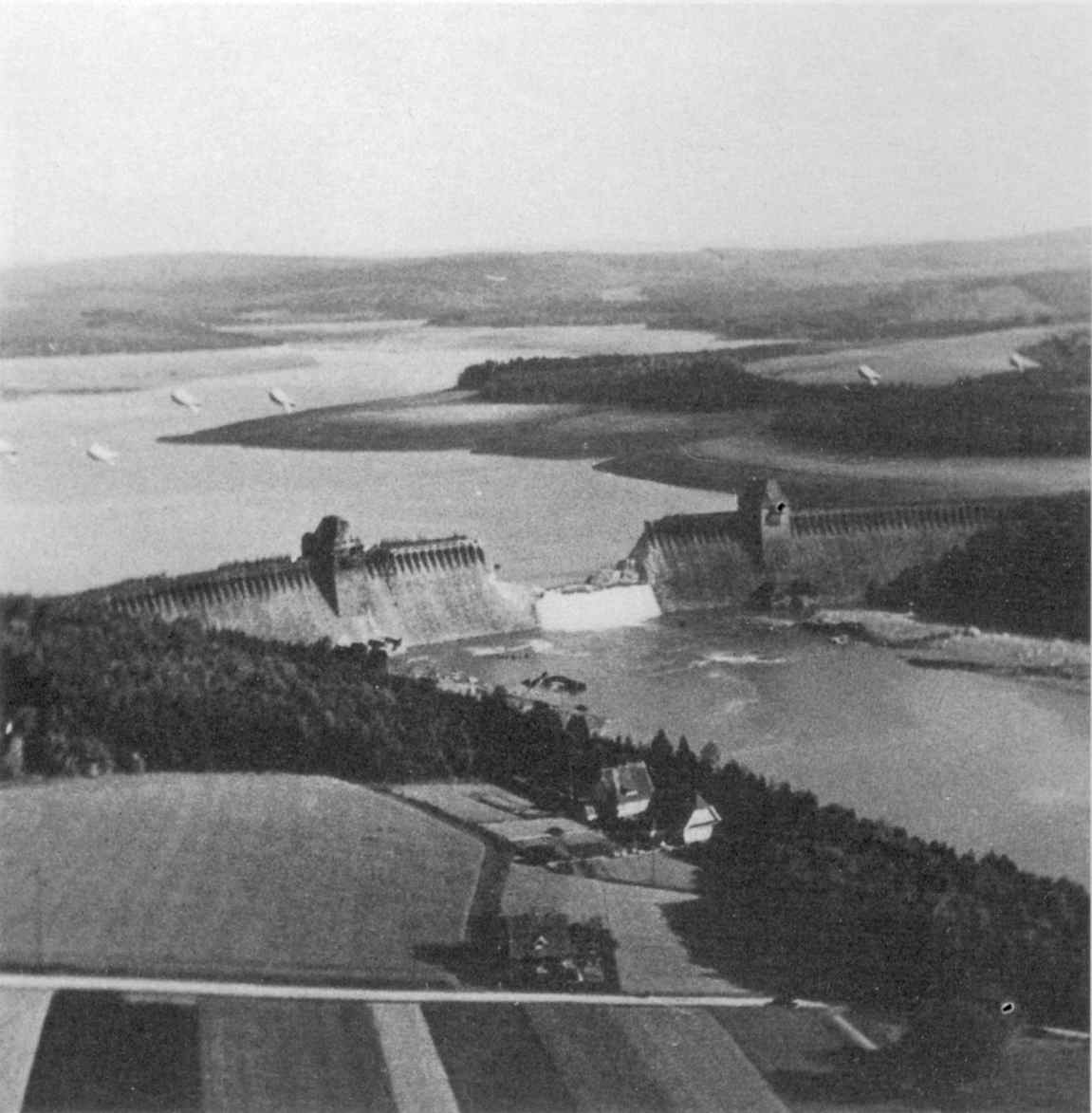
- The Möhne Dam the day following the attacks
Date	16–17 May 1943
Location	Eder, Möhne and Sorpe (Röhr) rivers, Germany
Result	British victory

Belligerents
United Kingdom	Germany

Commanders and leaders
Guy Gibson	Josef Kammhuber

Strength
19 Lancaster bombers	XII. Fliegerkorps (Defending three dams)

Casualties and losses
8 aircraft lost 53 aircrew killed 3 aircrew taken prisoner.	2 dams breached 1 dam lightly damaged c. 1,600 civilians killed (including c. 1,000 prisoners and slave labourers, mainly Soviet)

Operation Chastise, commonly known as the Dambusters Raid, was an attack on German dams carried out on the night of 16/17 May 1943 by 617 Squadron RAF Bomber Command, later called the Dam Busters, using special bouncing bombs developed by Barnes Wallis. The Möhne and Edersee dams were breached, causing catastrophic flooding of the Ruhr valley and of villages in the Eder valley; the Sorpe Dam sustained only minor damage. Two hydroelectric power stations were destroyed, and several more were damaged. Factories and mines were also damaged and destroyed. An estimated 1,600 civilians – about 600 Germans and 1,000 enslaved labourers, mainly Soviet – were killed by the flooding. Despite rapid repairs by the Germans, production did not return to normal until September. The RAF lost 56 aircrew, with 53 dead and three captured, amid losses of eight aircraft.

== Background ==
Before the Second World War, the British Air Ministry had identified the industrialised Ruhr Valley, especially its dams, as important strategic targets. The dams provided hydroelectric power and pure water for steel-making, drinking water, and water for the canal transport system. Calculations indicated that attacks with large bombs could be effective but required a degree of accuracy which RAF Bomber Command had been unable to attain when attacking a well-defended target. A one-off surprise attack might succeed, but the RAF lacked a weapon suitable for the task.

== Concept ==
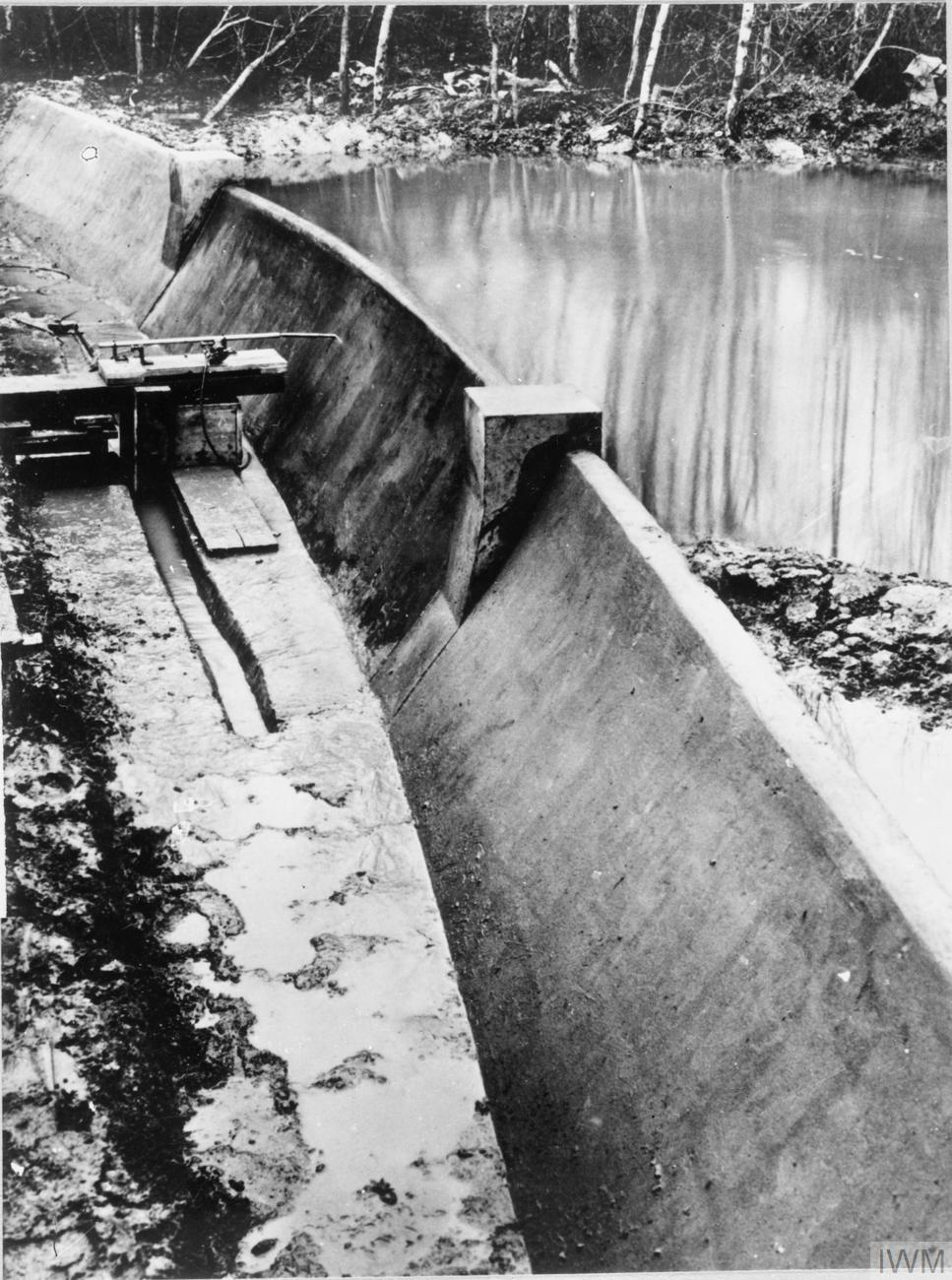
1:50 scale model of the Möhne Dam, Building Research Establishment 51.701764°N 0.374486°W

The mission grew out of a concept for a bomb designed by Barnes Wallis, assistant chief designer at Vickers. Wallis had worked on the Vickers Wellesley and Vickers Wellington bombers and while working on the Vickers Windsor, he had also begun work, with Admiralty support, on an anti-shipping bomb, although dam destruction was soon considered. At first, Wallis wanted to drop a 10-long-ton (10.2-tonne) bomb from an altitude of about 40,000 ft (12,000 m), part of the earthquake bomb concept. No bomber aircraft was capable of flying at such an altitude or of carrying such a heavy bomb and although Wallis proposed the six-engined Victory Bomber for this purpose this was rejected. Wallis realised that a much smaller explosive charge would suffice if it exploded against the dam wall under the water, but German reservoir dams were protected by heavy torpedo nets to prevent an explosive device from travelling through the water.

Wallis devised a 9,000 lb (4,100 kg) bomb (more accurately, a mine) in the shape of a cylinder, equivalent to a very large depth charge armed with a hydrostatic fuse, designed to be given a backspin of 500 rpm. Dropped at 60 ft (18 m) and 240 mph (390 km/h) from the release point, the mine would skip across the surface of the water before hitting the dam wall as its forward speed ceased. Initially the backspin was intended to increase the range of the mine, but it was later realised that it would also cause the mine, after submerging, to run down the side of the dam towards its base, thus maximising the explosive effect against the dam. This weapon was code-named Upkeep.

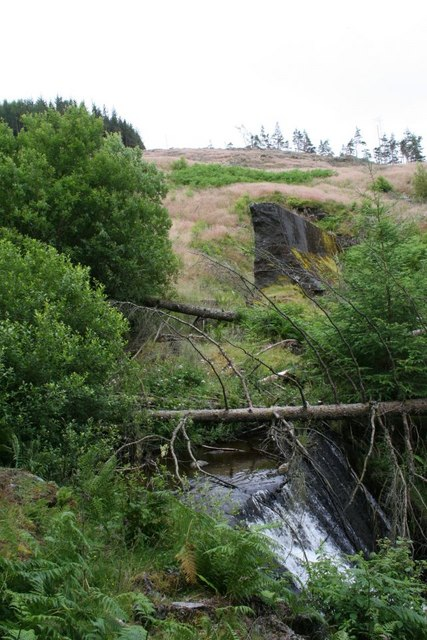
Remains of the Nant-y-Gro dam breached in July 1942 during testing

Testing of the concept included blowing up a scale model dam at the Building Research Establishment, Watford, in May 1942 and then the breaching of the disused Nant-y-Gro dam in Wales in July. A subsequent test suggested that a charge of 7,500 lb (3,400 kg) exploded 30 ft (9.1 m) under water would breach a full-size dam; crucially, this weight would be within the carrying capacity of an Avro Lancaster. The first air drop trials were at Chesil Beach in December 1942; these used a spinning 4 feet 6 inches (1.37 m) sphere dropped from a modified Vickers Wellington, serial BJ895/G; the same aircraft was used until April 1943 when the first modified Lancasters became available. The tests continued at Chesil Beach and Reculver, often unsuccessfully, using revised designs of the mine and variations of speed and height.

Avro Chief Designer Roy Chadwick adapted the Lancaster to carry the mine. To reduce weight, much of the internal armour was removed, as was the mid-upper (dorsal) gun turret. The dimensions of the mine and its unusual shape meant that the bomb-bay doors had to be removed and the mine hung partly below the fuselage. It was mounted on two crutches and before dropping it was spun by an auxiliary motor. Chadwick also worked out the design and installation of controls and gear for the carriage and release of the mine in conjunction with Barnes Wallis. The Avro Lancaster B Mk IIIs so modified were known as Lancaster B Mark III Special (Type 464 Provisioning).

Using two spotlights to ascertain the required height, a modified Lancaster dropped a backspun drum-bomb which skipped over the torpedo nets protecting the dam. After impact, the bomb spun down to the dam's base and exploded.

In February 1943, Air Vice-Marshal Francis Linnell at the Ministry of Aircraft Production thought the work was diverting Wallis from the development of the Vickers Windsor bomber (which did not become operational). Pressure from Linnell via the chairman of Vickers, Sir Charles Worthington Craven, caused Wallis to offer to resign. Sir Arthur Harris, head of Bomber Command, after a briefing by Linnell also opposed the allocation of his bombers; Harris was about to start the strategic bombing campaign against Germany and Lancasters were just entering service. Wallis had written to an influential intelligence officer, Group Captain Frederick Winterbotham, who ensured that the Chief of the Air Staff, Air Chief Marshal Charles Portal, heard of the project. Portal saw the film of the Chesil Beach trials and was convinced. On 26 February 1943, Portal over-ruled Harris and ordered that thirty Lancasters were to be allocated to the mission and the target date was set for May, when water levels would be at their highest and breaches in the dams would cause the most damage. With eight weeks to go, the larger Upkeep mine that was needed for the mission and the modifications to the Lancasters had yet to be designed.

=== Assignment ===
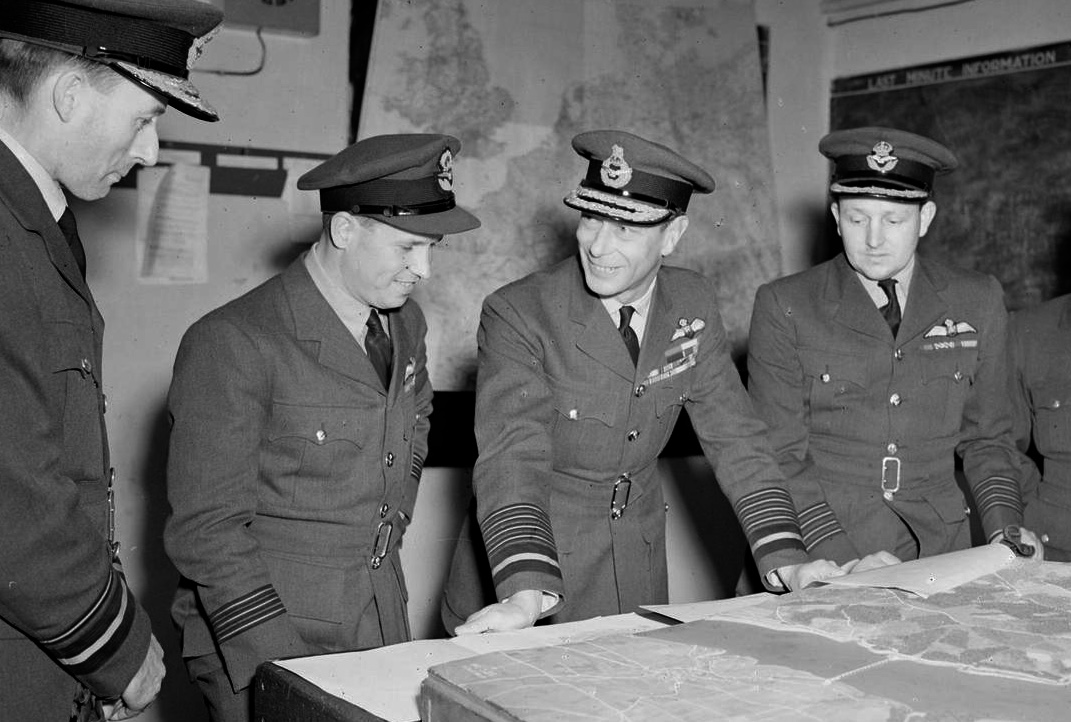
Air Vice-Marshal Ralph Cochrane, Wing Commander Guy Gibson, King George VI and Group Captain John Whitworth discussing the Dambuster Raid in May 1943

The operation was given to No. 5 Group RAF, which formed a new squadron to undertake the dams mission. It was initially called Squadron X, later to be named No. 617 Squadron, as the speed of its formation outstripped the RAF process for naming squadrons. Led by 24-year-old Wing Commander Guy Gibson, a veteran of more than 170 bombing and night-fighter missions, 21 bomber crews were selected from 5 Group squadrons. The crews included RAF personnel of several nationalities, members of the Royal Australian Air Force (RAAF), Royal Canadian Air Force (RCAF) and Royal New Zealand Air Force (RNZAF). The squadron was based at RAF Scampton, about 5 mi (8 km) north of Lincoln.

The targets selected were the Möhne Dam and the Sorpe Dam, upstream from the Ruhr industrial area, with the Eder Dam on the Eder River, which feeds into the Weser, as a secondary target. The loss of hydroelectric power was important but the loss of water to industry, cities and canals would have greater effect and there was potential for devastating flooding if the dams broke.

=== Preparations ===
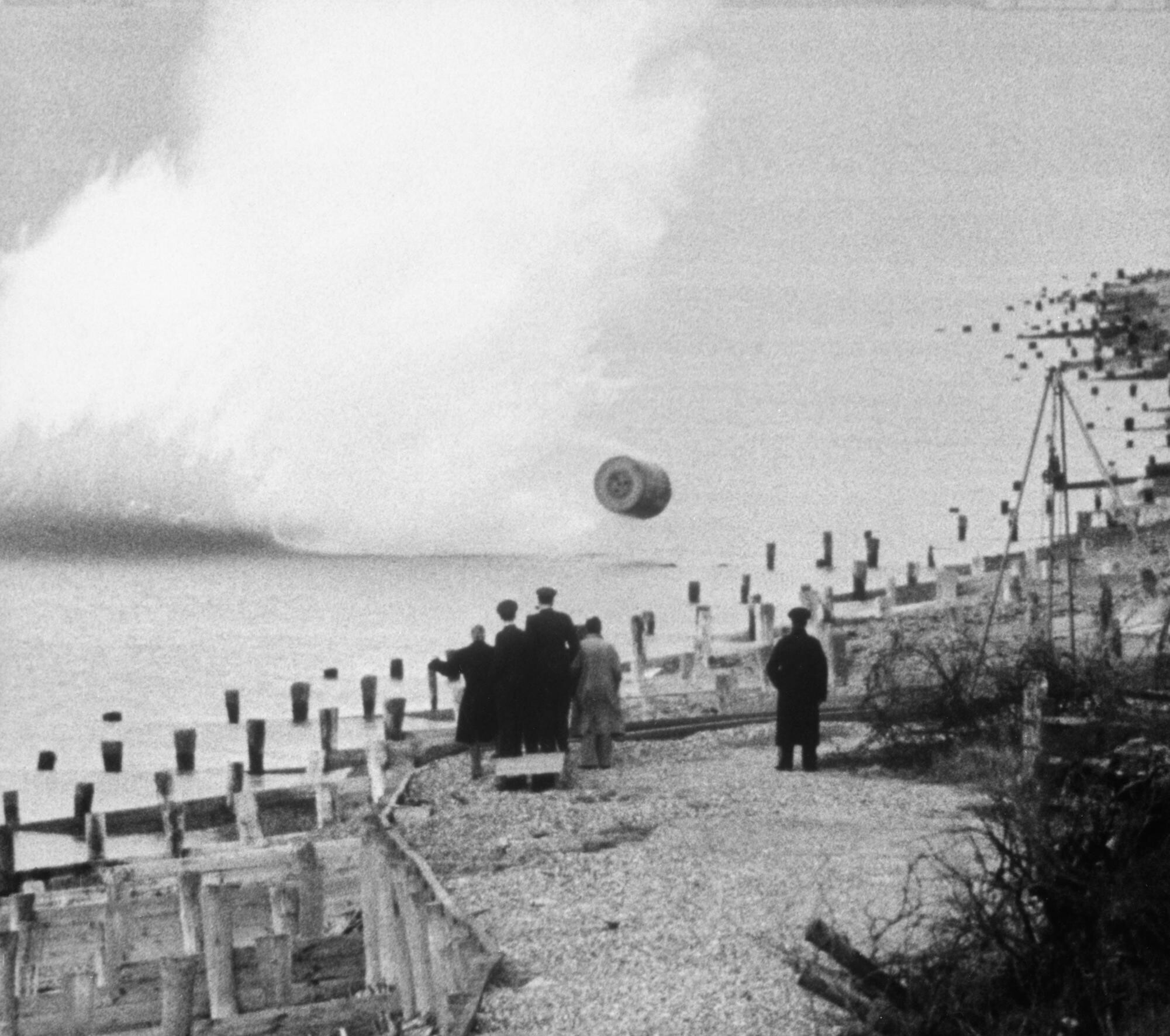
Barnes Wallis and others watch a practice Upkeep bomb strike the shoreline at Reculver, Kent.

Bombing from an altitude of 60 ft (18 m), at an air speed of 240 mph (390 km/h) and at a set distance from the target called for expert crews. Intensive night-time and low-altitude training began. There were also technical problems to solve, the first one being to determine when the aircraft was at optimum distance from its target. The Möhne and Eder Dams had towers at each end. A special targeting device with two prongs, making the same angle as the two towers at the correct distance from the dam, showed when to release the bomb. (The BBC documentary Dambusters Declassified (2010) stated that the pronged device was ultimately not used, owing to problems related to vibration, and that other methods were employed, including a length of string tied in a loop and pulled back centrally to a fixed point, in the manner of a catapult.)

The second problem was determining the aircraft's altitude, as barometric altimeters lacked accuracy. Two spotlights were mounted, one under the aircraft's nose and the other under the fuselage, so that at the correct height their light beams would converge on the surface of the water. The crews practised at the Eyebrook Reservoir, near Uppingham, Rutland; Abberton Reservoir near Colchester; Derwent Reservoir in the Derbyshire Peak District; and Fleet Lagoon on Chesil Beach. Wallis's bomb was first tested at the Elan Valley Reservoirs.

The lights were developed by Edward Spence Calvert (1902–91), of Northern Ireland, at the RAE in Hampshire, with an initial proposal by Ben Lockspeiser. After the war, Calvert, with his assistant Jack Sparke, developed the system of aircraft landing lights mostly found across British airports today, known as 'centre line and crossbar' approach lighting system, first tested in the Berlin Airlift. The ICAO adopted the Calvert approach system in 1952. All NATO airfields have the lighting system, with six transverse rows of lights. With Jack Sparke, he also developed the visual approach slope indicator in the late 1950s. He was head of the illumination section of the RAE from 1941 to 1967.

Gibson also had VHF radios (normally reserved for fighters) fitted to the Lancasters so that he could control the operation while over the target, an early example of what became the master bomber role.

The squadron took delivery of the bombs on 13 May, after the final tests on 29 April. At 18:00 on 15 May, at a meeting in Whitworth's house, Gibson and Wallis briefed the squadron's two flight commanders, Squadron Leader Henry Eric Maudslay and Sqn Ldr H. M. "Dinghy" Young, Gibson's deputy for the Möhne attack, Flt Lt John V. Hopgood and the squadron bombing leader, Flight Lieutenant Bob Hay. The rest of the crews were told at a series of briefings the following day, which began with a briefing of pilots, navigators and bomb-aimers at about midday.

=== Organisation ===
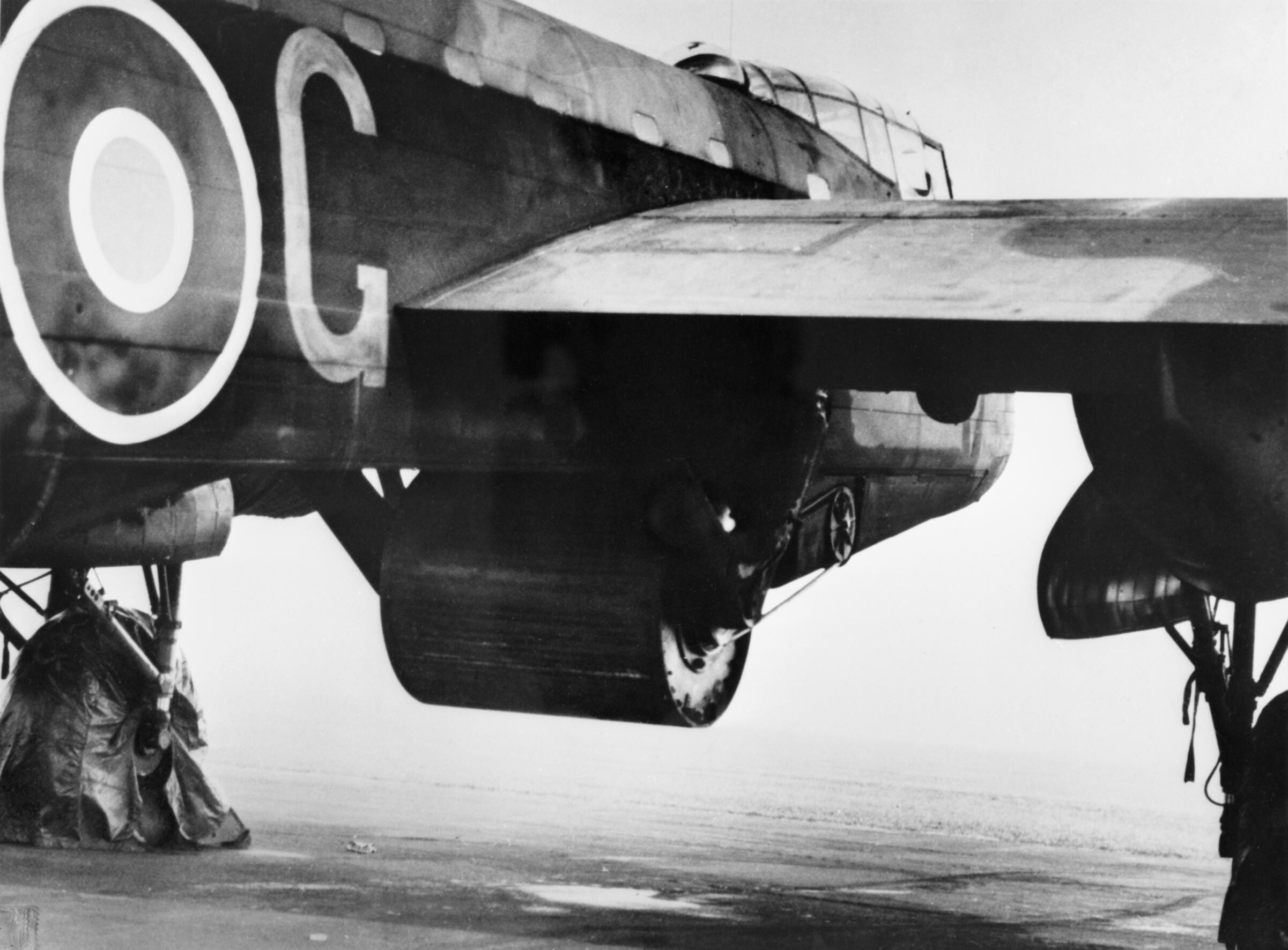
"Upkeep" bouncing bomb mounted under Gibson's Lancaster B III (Special)

Formation No. 1 was composed of nine aircraft in three groups (listed by pilot): Gibson, Hopgood and Flt Lt H. B. "Micky" Martin (an Australian serving in the RAF); Young, Flt Lt David Maltby and Flt Lt Dave Shannon (RAAF); and Maudslay, Flt Lt Bill Astell and Pilot Officer Les Knight (RAAF). Its mission was to attack the Möhne; any aircraft with bombs remaining would then attack the Eder.

Formation No. 2, numbering five aircraft, piloted by Flt Lt Joe McCarthy (an American serving in the RCAF), P/O Vernon Byers (RCAF), Flt Lt Norman Barlow (RAAF), P/O Geoff Rice and Flt Lt Les Munro (RNZAF), was to attack the Sorpe.

Formation No. 3 was a mobile reserve consisting of aircraft piloted by Flight Sergeant Cyril Anderson, Flt Sgt Bill Townsend, Flt Sgt Ken Brown (RCAF), P/O Warner Ottley and P/O Lewis Burpee (RCAF), taking off two hours later on 17 May, either to bomb the main dams or to attack three smaller secondary target dams: the Lister, the Ennepe and the Diemel.

Two crews were unable to make the mission owing to illness.

The Operations Room for the mission was at 5 Group Headquarters in St Vincents Hall, Grantham, Lincolnshire. The mission codes (transmitted in morse) were: Goner, meaning "bomb dropped"; Nigger, meaning that the Möhne was breached; and Dinghy, meaning that the Eder was breached. Nigger was the name of Gibson's dog, a black Labrador Retriever that had been run over and killed on the morning of the attack. Dinghy was Young's nickname, a reference to the fact that he had twice survived crash landings at sea where he and his crew were rescued from the aircraft's inflatable rubber dinghy.

== History of the attacks ==
=== Outbound ===
Locations of the primary and secondary target dams
1 Möhne
2 Sorpe
3 Edersee
4 Ennepe
5 Diemel
6 Lister

The aircraft used two routes, carefully avoiding known concentrations of flak, and were timed to cross the enemy coast simultaneously. The first aircraft, those of Formation No. 2 heading for the longer, northern route, took off at 21:28 on 16 May. McCarthy's bomber developed a coolant leak, and he took off in the reserve aircraft 34 minutes late.

Formation No. 1 took off in groups of three at 10-minute intervals beginning at 21:39. The reserve formation did not begin taking off until 00:09 on 17 May.

Formation No. 1 entered continental Europe between Walcheren and Schouwen, flew over the Netherlands, skirted the airbases at Gilze-Rijen and Eindhoven, curved around the Ruhr defences, and turned north to avoid Hamm before turning south to head for the Möhne River. Formation No. 2 flew further north, cutting over Vlieland and crossing the IJsselmeer before joining the first route near Wesel and then flying south beyond the Möhne to the Sorpe River.

The bombers flew low, at about 100 ft (30 m) altitude, to avoid radar detection. Flight Sergeant George Chalmers, radio operator on "O for Orange", looked out through the astrodome and was astonished to see that his pilot was flying towards the target along a forest's firebreak, below treetop level.

=== First casualties ===
The first casualties were suffered soon after reaching the Dutch coast. Formation No. 2 did not fare well: Munro's aircraft lost its radio to flak and turned back over the IJsselmeer, while Rice flew too low and struck the sea, losing his bomb in the water; he recovered and returned to base. After the completion of the raid Gibson sympathised with Rice, telling him how he had also nearly lost his bomb to the sea. Barlow and Byers crossed the coast around the island of Texel. Byers was shot down by flak shortly afterwards, crashing into the Waddenzee. Barlow's aircraft hit electricity pylons and crashed 5 km east of Rees, near Haldern. The bomb was thrown clear of the crash and was examined intact by Heinz Schweizer. Only the delayed bomber piloted by McCarthy survived to cross the Netherlands. Formation No. 1 lost Astell's bomber near the German hamlet of Marbeck when his Lancaster hit high voltage electrical cables and crashed into a field.

=== Attack on the Möhne Dam ===
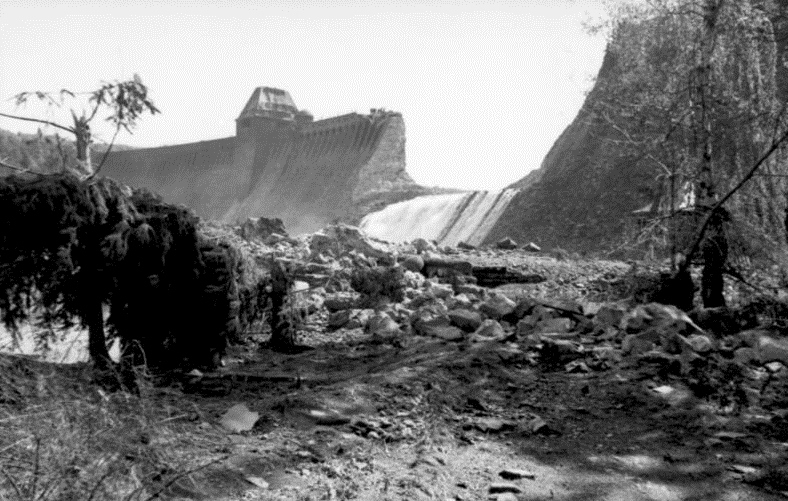
Möhne Dam after the attack

Formation No. 1 arrived over the Möhne lake and Gibson's aircraft (G for George) made the first run, followed by Hopgood (M for Mother). Hopgood's aircraft was hit by flak as it made its low-level run and was caught in the blast of its own bomb, crashing shortly afterwards when a wing disintegrated. Three crew members successfully abandoned the aircraft, but only two survived. Subsequently, Gibson flew his aircraft across the dam to draw the flak away from Martin's run. Martin (P for Popsie) bombed third; his aircraft was damaged, but made a successful attack. Next, Young (A for Apple) made a successful run, and after him Maltby (J for Johnny), when finally the dam was breached. Gibson, with Young accompanying, led Shannon, Maudslay and Knight to the Eder.

=== Attack on the Eder Dam ===
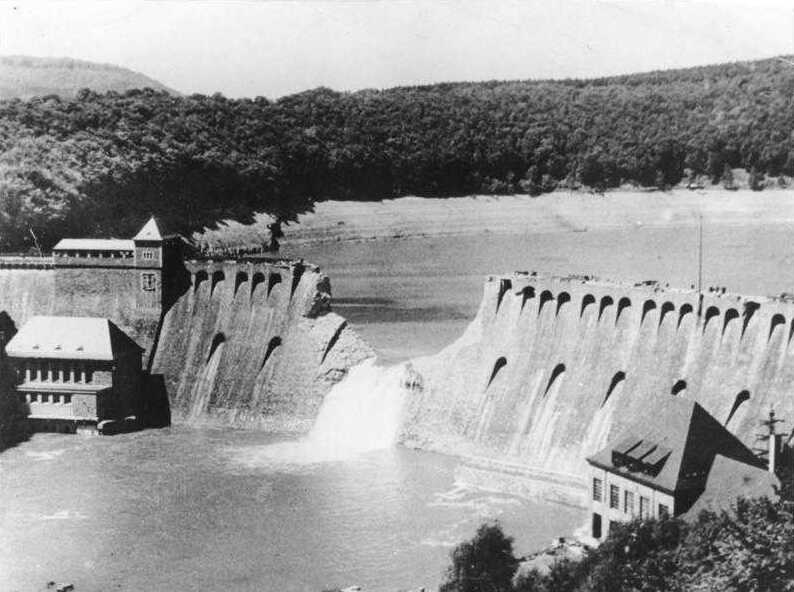
Eder Dam on 17 May 1943

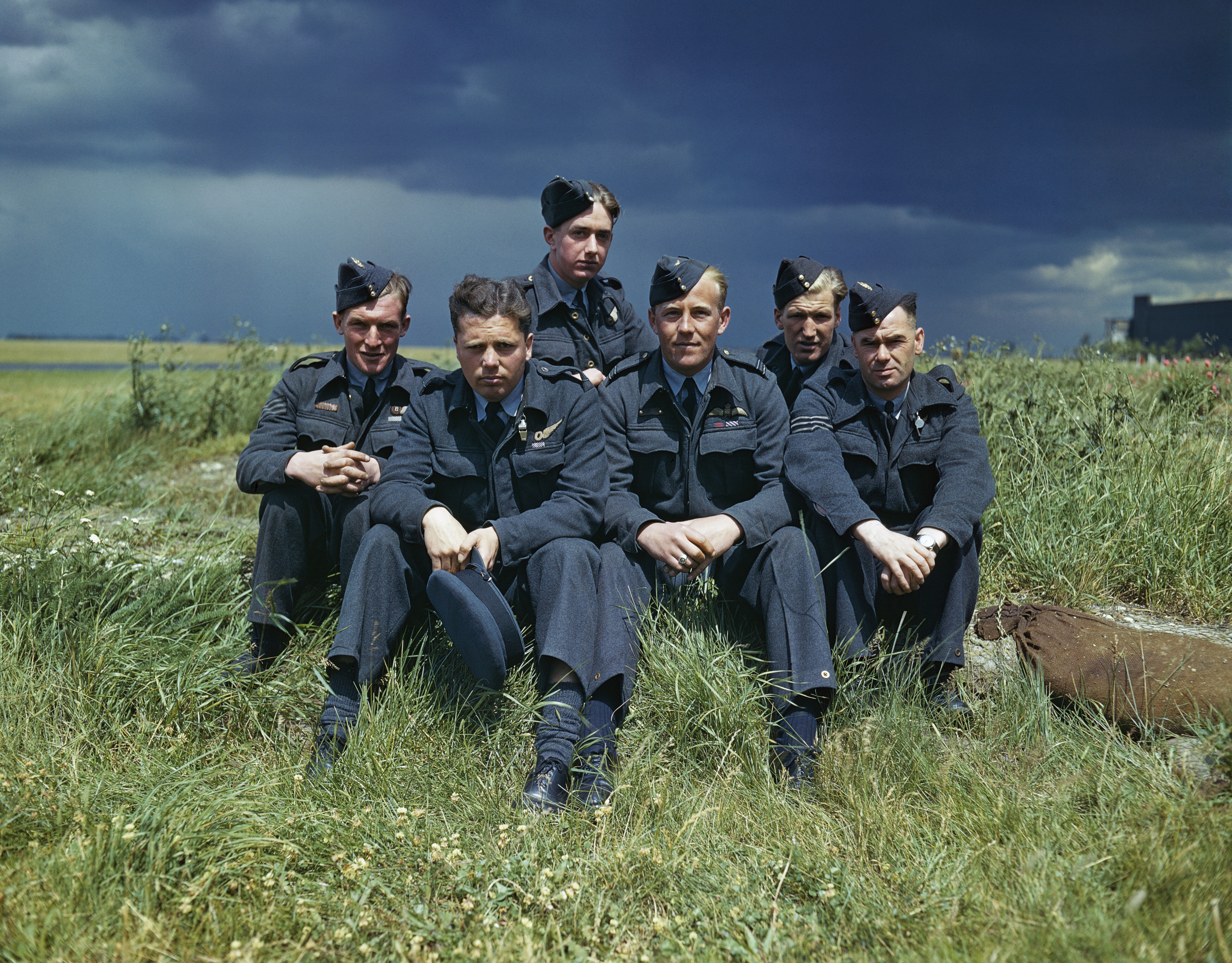
The crew of "T for Tommy"

The Eder Valley was covered by heavy fog, but the dam was not defended with anti-aircraft positions as the difficult topography of the surrounding hills was thought to make an attack virtually impossible. With the approach so difficult, the first aircraft, Shannon's, made six runs before taking a break. Maudslay (Z for Zebra) then attempted a run, but the bomb struck the top of the dam, and the aircraft was severely damaged in the blast. Shannon made another run and successfully dropped his bomb. The final bomb of the formation, from Knight's aircraft (N for Nut), breached the dam.

=== Attacks on the Sorpe and Ennepe Dams ===
The Sorpe dam was the one least likely to be breached. It was a huge earthen dam, unlike the two concrete-and-steel gravity dams that were attacked successfully. Due to various problems, only two Lancasters reached the Sorpe Dam: Joe McCarthy (in T for Tommy, a delayed aircraft from the second wave) and later Brown (F for Freddie) from the third formation. This attack differed from the previous ones in two ways: the 'Upkeep' bomb was not spun, and due to the topography of the valley the approach was made along the length of the dam, not at right angles over the reservoir.

McCarthy's plane was on its own when it arrived over the Sorpe Dam at 00:15 hours, and realised the approach was even more difficult than expected: the flight path led over a church steeple in the village of Langscheid, located on the hillcrest overlooking the dam. With only seconds to go before the bomber had to pull up, to avoid hitting the hillside at the other end of the dam, the bomb aimer George Johnson had no time to correct the bomber's height and heading.

McCarthy made nine attempted bombing runs before Johnson was satisfied. The 'Upkeep' bomb was dropped on the tenth run. The bomb exploded, but when he turned his Lancaster to assess the damage, it turned out that only a section of the crest of the dam had been blown off; the main body of the dam remained.

Three of the reserve aircraft had been directed to the Sorpe Dam. Burpee (S for Sugar) never arrived, and it was later determined that the plane had been shot down while skirting the Gilze-Rijen airfield. Brown (F for Freddie) reached the Sorpe Dam: in the increasingly dense fog, after seven runs, Brown conferred with his bomb aimer and dropped incendiary devices on either side of the valley, which ignited a fire which subsequently lifted the fog enough to drop a direct hit on the eighth run. The bomb cracked but failed to breach the dam. Anderson (Y for York) never arrived having been delayed by damage to his rear turret and dense fog which made his attempts to find the target impossible. The remaining two bombers were then sent to secondary targets, with Ottley (C for Charlie) being shot down en route to the Lister Dam. Townsend (O for Orange) eventually dropped his bomb at the Ennepe Dam without harming it.

=== Possible attack on Bever Dam ===
There is some evidence that Townsend might have attacked the Bever Dam by mistake rather than the Ennepe Dam. The War Diary of the German Naval Staff reported that the Bever Dam was attacked at nearly the same time that the Sorpe Dam was. In addition, the Wupperverband authority responsible for the Bever Dam is said to have recovered the remains of a "mine"; and Paul Keiser, a 19-year-old soldier on leave at his home close to the Bever Dam, reported a bomber making several approaches to the dam and then dropping a bomb that caused a large explosion and a great pillar of flame.

In the book The Dambusters' Raid, author John Sweetman suggests Townsend's report of the moon reflecting on the mist and water is consistent with an attack that was heading to the Bever Dam rather than to the Ennepe Dam, given the moon's azimuth and altitude during the bombing attacks. Sweetman also points out that the Ennepe-Wasserverband authority was adamant that only a single bomb was dropped near the Ennepe Dam during the entire war, and that this bomb fell into the woods by the side of the dam, not in the water, as in Townsend's report. Finally, members of Townsend's crew independently reported seeing a manor house and attacking an earthen dam, which is consistent with the Bever Dam rather than the Ennepe Dam. The main evidence supporting the hypothesis of an attack of the Ennepe Dam is Townsend's post-flight report that he attacked the Ennepe Dam on a heading of 355 degrees magnetic. Assuming that the heading was incorrect, all other evidence points toward an attack on the Bever Dam.

Townsend reported difficulty in finding his dam, and in his post-raid report he complained that the map of the Ennepe Dam was incorrect. The Bever Dam is only about 5 mi (8 km) southwest of the Ennepe Dam. With the early-morning fog that filled the valleys, it would be understandable for him to have mistaken the two reservoirs.

=== Return flight ===
On the way back, flying again at treetop level, two more Lancasters were lost. The damaged aircraft of Maudslay was struck by flak near Netterden, and Young's (A for Apple) was hit by flak north of IJmuiden and crashed into the North Sea just off the coast of the Netherlands. On the return flight over the Dutch coast, some German flak aimed at the aircraft was aimed so low that shells were seen to bounce off the sea.

Eleven bombers began landing at Scampton at 03:11 hours, with Gibson returning at 04:15. The last of the survivors, Townsend's bomber, landed at 06:15. It was the last to land because one of its engines had been shut down after passing the Dutch coast. Air Chief Marshal Harris was among those who came out to greet the last crew to land.

== List of aircraft involved ==
Serial No	Aircraft call sign	Commander	Target	Attacked target?	Hit target?	Breached target?	Returned?	Notes
First Wave
ED932	G George	Gibson	Möhne Dam	Yes	No	—N/a	Yes	Raid leader. Mine exploded short of dam. Used aircraft to draw anti-aircraft fire away from other crews.
ED925	M Mother	Hopgood	Möhne Dam	Yes	No	—N/a	No	Hit by anti-aircraft fire outbound. Mine bounced over dam. Shot down over the target while attacking. (P/O Fraser and P/O Burcher survived)
ED909	P Peter (Popsie)	Martin	Möhne Dam	Yes	No	—N/a	Yes	Mine missed the target.
ED887	A Apple	Young	Möhne Dam	Yes	Yes	Yes	No	Mine hit dam and caused small breach. On the homeward flight Lancaster AJ-A was hit by anti-aircraft fire and crashed along the shoreline 2 km south of the Dutch coastal resort of Castricum aan Zee. All seven crew members lost their lives and are buried at the Bergen General Cemetery.
ED906	J Johnny	Maltby	Möhne Dam	Yes	Yes	Yes	Yes	Mine hit dam and caused a large breach.
ED929	L Leather	Shannon	Eder Dam	Yes	Yes	No	Yes	Mine hit target—no effect.
ED937	Z Zebra	Maudslay	Eder Dam	Yes	No	—N/a	No	Mine overshot target and damaged the bomber, which was shot down over Germany while trying to return.
ED912	N Nuts	Knight	Eder Dam	Yes	Yes	Yes	Yes	Mine hit the dam and caused a large breach.
ED864	B Baker	Astell	N/A	No	—N/a	—N/a	No	Crashed after hitting large-scale power lines outbound.
Second Wave
ED825	T Tommy	McCarthy	Sorpe Dam	Yes	Yes	No	Yes	Mine hit the target – no apparent effect.
ED927	E Easy	Barlow	N/A	No	—N/a	—N/a	No	Crashed after hitting power lines outbound.
ED934	K King	Byers	N/A	No	—N/a	—N/a	No	Shot down over the Dutch coast outbound.
ED936	H Harry	Rice	N/A	No	—N/a	—N/a	Yes	Lost the mine after clipping the sea outbound. Returned without attacking a target.
ED921	W Willie	Munro	N/A	No	—N/a	—N/a	Yes	Damaged by anti-aircraft fire over the Dutch coast. Returned without attacking a target.
Third Wave
ED924	Y York	Anderson	Sorpe Dam	No	—N/a	—N/a	Yes	Could not find the target due to mist. Landed at Scampton with an armed mine.
ED918	F Freddy	Brown	Sorpe Dam	Yes	Yes	No	Yes	Mine hit the target – no apparent effect.
ED886	O Orange	Townsend	Ennepe or Bever Dam	Yes	Yes	No	Yes	Mine hit the target – no apparent effect.
ED865	S Sugar	Burpee	N/A	No	—N/a	—N/a	No	Shot down over the Netherlands outbound.
ED910	C Charlie	Ottley	N/A	No	—N/a	—N/a	No	Shot down over Germany outbound. Frederick Tees was the sole survivor
Totals	19 aircraft		4 dams	11 of 19	7 of 11	3 of 7	11 of 19	2 hit power lines outbound; 3 shot down outbound; 3 returned without attacking; 11 attacked; 1 shot down over target; 2 shot down homebound; 8 attacked target and returned.

== Bomb damage assessment ==
Bomber Command wanted a bomb damage assessment as soon as possible and the CO of 542 Squadron was informed of the estimated time of the attacks. A photo-reconnaissance Spitfire, piloted by Flying Officer Frank 'Jerry' Fray, took off from RAF Benson at 07:30 hours and arrived over the Ruhr River some hours after first light. Photos were taken of the breached dams and the huge floods. The pilot later described the experience:

When I was about 150 miles [240 km] from the Möhne Dam, I could see the industrial haze over the Ruhr area and what appeared to be a cloud to the east. On flying closer, I saw that what had seemed to be cloud was the sun shining on the floodwaters. I looked down into the deep valley which had seemed so peaceful three days before but now it was a wide torrent. The whole valley of the river was inundated with only patches of high ground and the tops of trees and church steeples showing above the flood. I was overcome by the immensity of it.

— Jerry Fray

== After the raid ==
Three aircrew from Hopgood's aircraft parachuted but one later died from wounds and the others were captured. A crewman in Ottley's aircraft survived its crash. In total, therefore, 53 of the 133 aircrew who participated in the attack were killed, a casualty rate of almost 40 percent. Thirteen of those killed were members of the RCAF and two belonged to the RAAF.

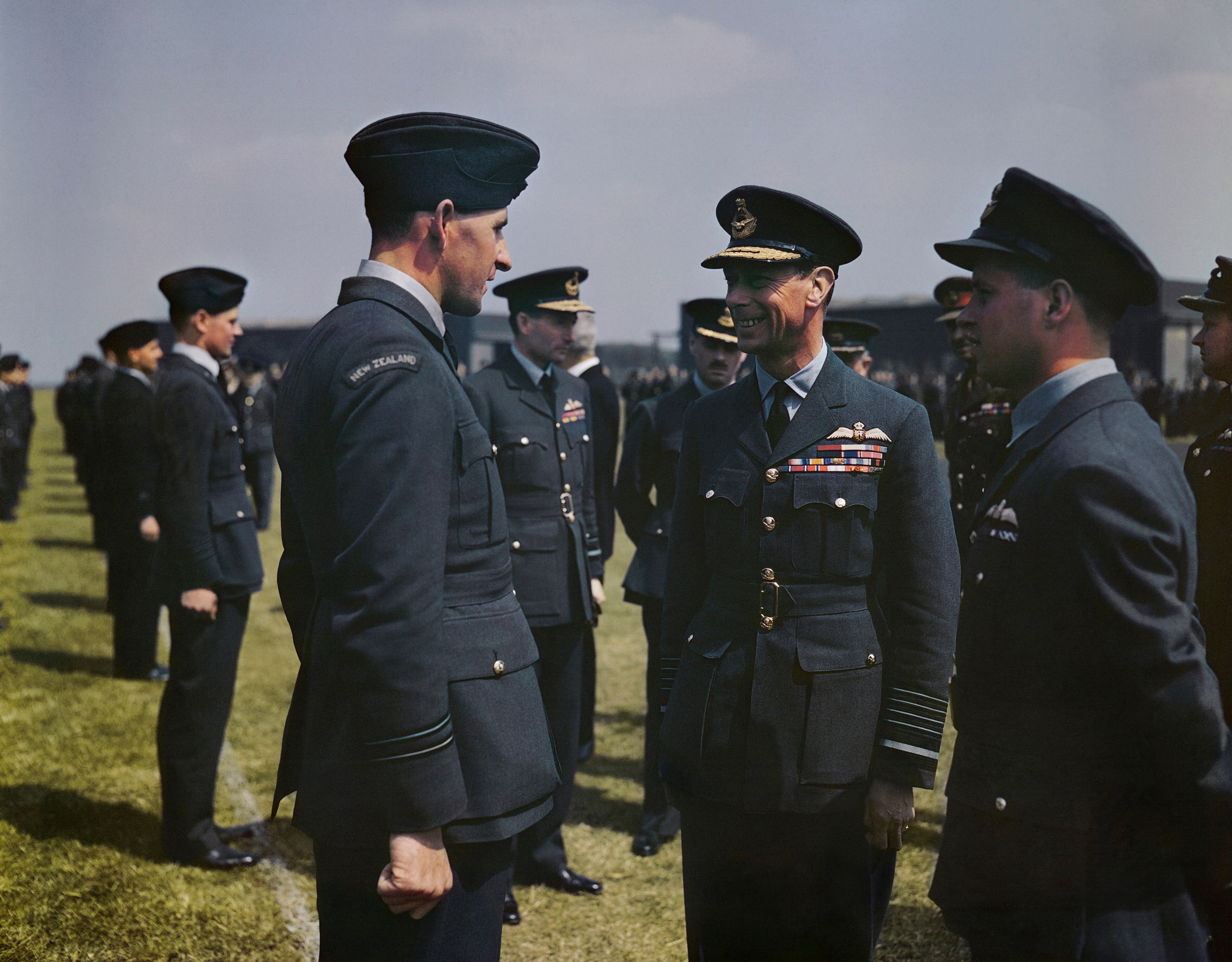
King George VI speaks to Flight Lieutenant Les Munro while visiting 617 Squadron after the raid, 27 May 1943

Of the survivors, 34 were decorated at Buckingham Palace on 22 June, with Gibson awarded the Victoria Cross. There were five Distinguished Service Orders, 10 Distinguished Flying Crosses and four bars, two Conspicuous Gallantry Medals, eleven Distinguished Flying Medals and one bar.

Initial German casualty estimates from the floods were 1,294 killed, including 749 French, Belgian, Dutch and Ukrainian prisoners of war and labourers. Later estimates put the death toll in the Möhne Valley at about 1,600, including people who drowned in the flood wave downstream from the dam.

After a public relations tour of North America, and time spent working in the Air Ministry in London writing the book published as Enemy Coast Ahead, Gibson returned to operations and was killed on a Mosquito operation in 1944.

Following the Dams Raid, 617 Squadron was kept together as a specialist unit. A motto, Après moi le déluge ("After me the flood"), and a squadron badge were chosen. According to Paul Brickhill there was some controversy over the motto, with the original version Après nous le déluge ("After us the flood") being rejected by the Heralds as having inappropriate provenance (having been coined, reportedly, by Madame de Pompadour) and après moi le déluge having been said by Louis XV in an "irresponsible" context. The motto having been chosen by King George VI, the latter was finally deemed acceptable. The squadron went on to drop the Tallboy and Grand Slam bombs, using an advanced bomb sight, which enabled the bombing of small targets with far greater accuracy than conventional bomb aiming techniques. A raid with the Tallboy sunk the German battleship Tirpitz.

In 1977, Article 56 of the Protocol I amendment to the Geneva Conventions outlawed attacks on dams "if such attack may cause the release of dangerous forces from the works or installations and consequent severe losses among the civilian population". There is however an exception if "it is used for other than its normal function and in regular, significant and direct support of military operations and if such attack is the only feasible way to terminate such support".

The last surviving member of the 617 Squadron (aka Dambusters) responsible for the Operation, Johnny Johnson, died in 2022.

== Effect on the war ==
=== Tactical view ===
The two direct mine hits on the Möhnesee dam resulted in a breach around 250 feet (76 m) wide and 292 feet (89 m) deep. The destroyed dam poured around 330 million tons of water into the western Ruhr region. A torrent of water around 33 feet (10 m) high and travelling at around 15 miles per hour (24 km/h) swept through the valleys of the Möhne and Ruhr rivers. A few mines were flooded; 11 small factories and 92 houses were destroyed and 114 factories and 971 houses were damaged. The floods washed away about 25 roads, railways and bridges as the flood waters spread for around 50 miles (80 km) from the source. Estimates show that before 15 May 1943 steel production on the Ruhr was 1 million tonnes; this dropped to a quarter of that level after the raid.

The Eder drains towards the east into the Fulda which runs into the Weser to the North Sea. The main purpose of the Edersee was then, as it is now, to act as a reservoir to keep the Weser and the Mittellandkanal navigable during the summer months. The wave from the breach was not strong enough to result in significant damage by the time it hit Kassel, approximately 22 miles (35 km) downstream.

The greatest impact on the Ruhr armaments production was the loss of hydroelectric power. Two power stations (producing 5,100 kilowatts) associated with the dam were destroyed and seven others were damaged. This resulted in a loss of electrical power in the factories and many households in the region for two weeks. In May 1943 coal production dropped by 400,000 tons which German sources attribute to the effects of the raid.

According to an article by German historian Ralf Blank, at least 1,650 people were killed: around 70 of these were in the Eder Valley, and at least 1,579 bodies were found along the Möhne and Ruhr rivers, with hundreds missing. Of the bodies found downriver of the Möhne Dam, 1,026 were foreign prisoners of war and forced labourers in different camps, mainly from the Soviet Union. Worst hit was the city of Neheim (now part of Neheim-Hüsten) at the confluence of the Möhne and Ruhr rivers, where over 800 people perished, among them at least 493 female forced labourers from the Soviet Union. Some non-German sources cite an earlier total of 749 for all foreigners in all camps in the Möhne and Ruhr valleys as the casualty count at a camp just below the Eder Dam.) One source states that the raid was no more than a minor inconvenience to the Ruhr's industrial output, although that is contradicted by others. The bombing boosted British morale.

In his book Inside the Third Reich, Albert Speer acknowledged the attempt: "That night, employing just a few bombers, the British came close to a success which would have been greater than anything they had achieved hitherto with a commitment of thousands of bombers." He also expressed puzzlement at the raids: the disruption of temporarily having to shift 7,000 construction workers to the Möhne and Eder repairs was offset by the failure of the Allies to follow up with additional (conventional) raids during the dams' reconstruction, and that represented a major lost opportunity. Barnes Wallis was also of this view; he revealed his deep frustration that Bomber Command never sent a high-level bombing force to hit the Möhne dam while repairs were being carried out. He argued that extreme precision would have been unnecessary and that even a few hits by conventional HE bombs would have prevented the rapid repair of the dam which was undertaken by the Germans.

=== Strategic view ===
The Dams Raid was, like many British air raids, undertaken with a view to the need to keep drawing German defensive effort back into Germany and away from actual and potential theatres of ground war, a policy which culminated in the Berlin raids of the winter of 1943–1944. In May 1943 this meant keeping the Luftwaffe aircraft and anti-aircraft defences away from the Soviet Union; in early 1944, it meant clearing the way for the aerial side of the forthcoming Operation Overlord. The considerable amount of labour and strategic resources committed to repairing the dams, factories, mines and railways could not be used in other ways, on the construction of the Atlantic Wall, for example. The pictures of the broken dams proved to be a propaganda and morale boost to the Allies, especially to the British, still suffering from the German bombing of the Baedeker Blitz that had peaked roughly a year earlier.

Even within Germany, as evidenced by Gauleiters' reports to Berlin at the time, the German population regarded the raids as a legitimate attack on military targets and thought they were "an extraordinary success on the part of the English". They were not regarded as a pure terror attack by the Germans, even in the Ruhr region, and in response the German authorities released relatively accurate (not exaggerated) estimates of the dead.

An effect of the dam raids was that Barnes Wallis's ideas on earthquake bombing, which had previously been rejected, came to be accepted by 'Bomber' Harris. Prior to this raid, bombing had used the tactic of area bombardment with many light bombs, in the hope that one would hit the target. Work on the earthquake bombs resulted in the Tallboy and Grand Slam weapons, which caused damage to German infrastructure in the later stages of the war. They rendered the V-2 rocket launch complex at Calais unusable, buried the V-3 guns, and destroyed bridges and other fortified installations, such as the Grand Slam attack on the railway viaduct at Bielefeld. The most notable successes were the partial collapse of 20-foot-thick (6 m) reinforced concrete roofs of U-boat pens at Brest, and the sinking of the battleship Tirpitz.

Harris regarded the raid as a failure and a waste of resources.

== Books and film ==
The raid was the subject of four books, Enemy Coast Ahead (1946) by Guy Gibson, The Dam Busters (1951) by Paul Brickhill, Dam Busters: The True Story of the Inventors and Airmen Who Led the Devastating Raid to Smash the German Dams in 1943 (2013) by James Holland, and Dam Busters: Canadian Airmen and the Secret Raid Against Nazi Germany (2018) by Ted Barris, a film, The Dam Busters (1955), and a video game, The Dam Busters (1984).

== Memorials ==
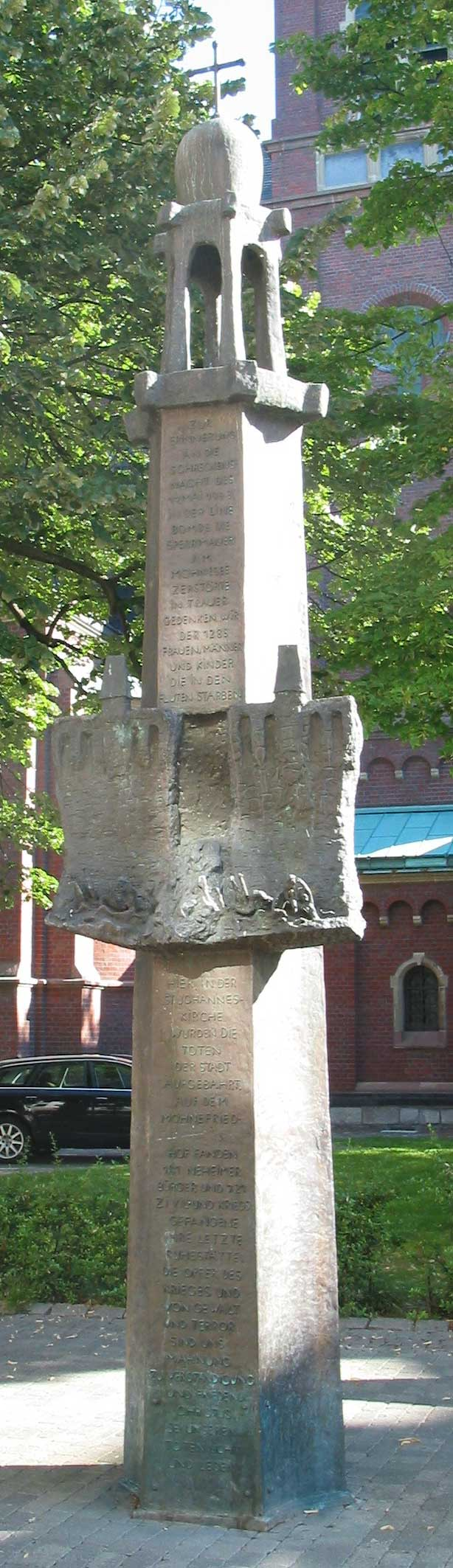
Memorial to the German dead in Neheim, 7 kilometres (4 mi) from the Möhne dam

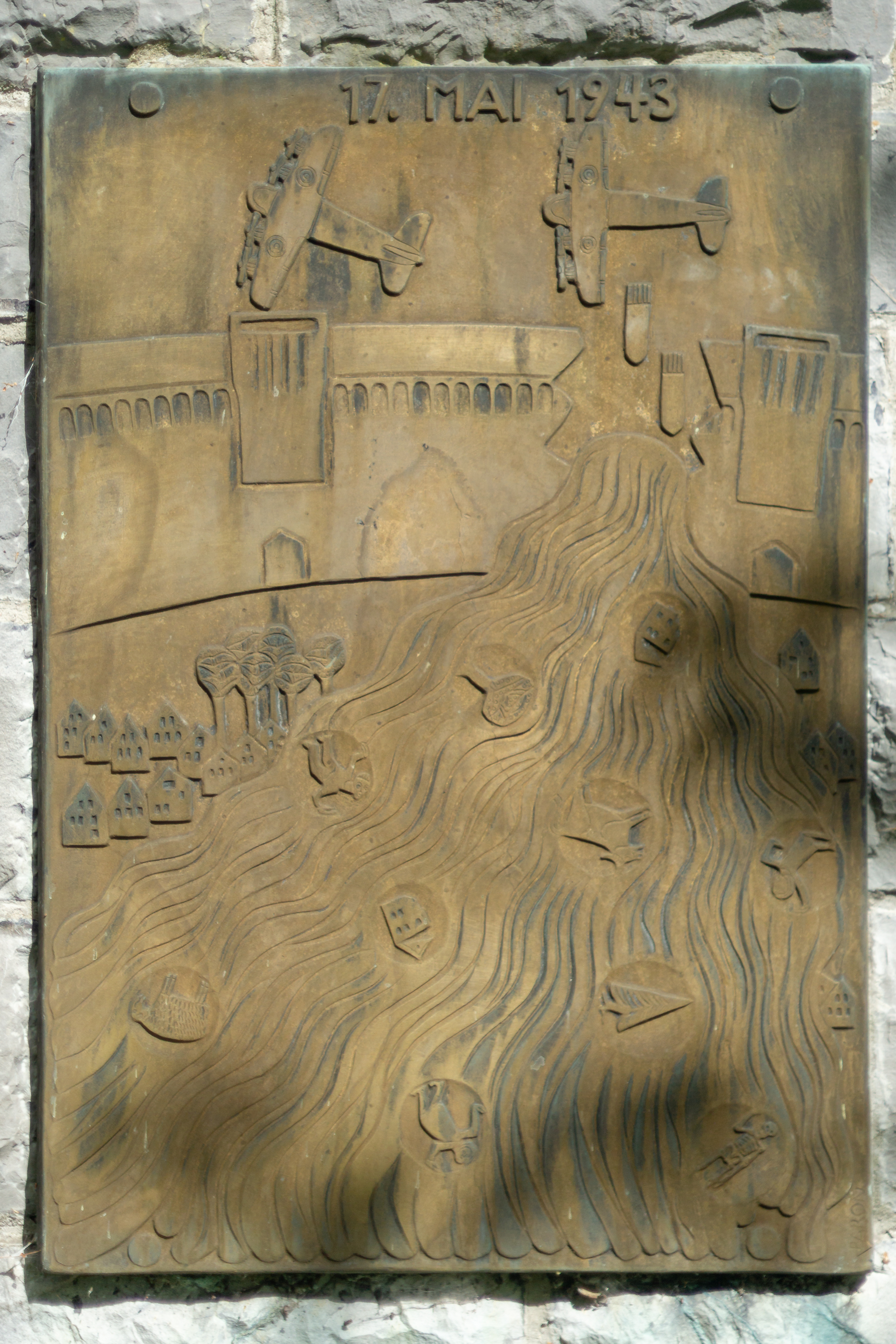
Plaque on the monument to the German victims of the bombing of the Möhne dam, called there the Möhnekatastrophe

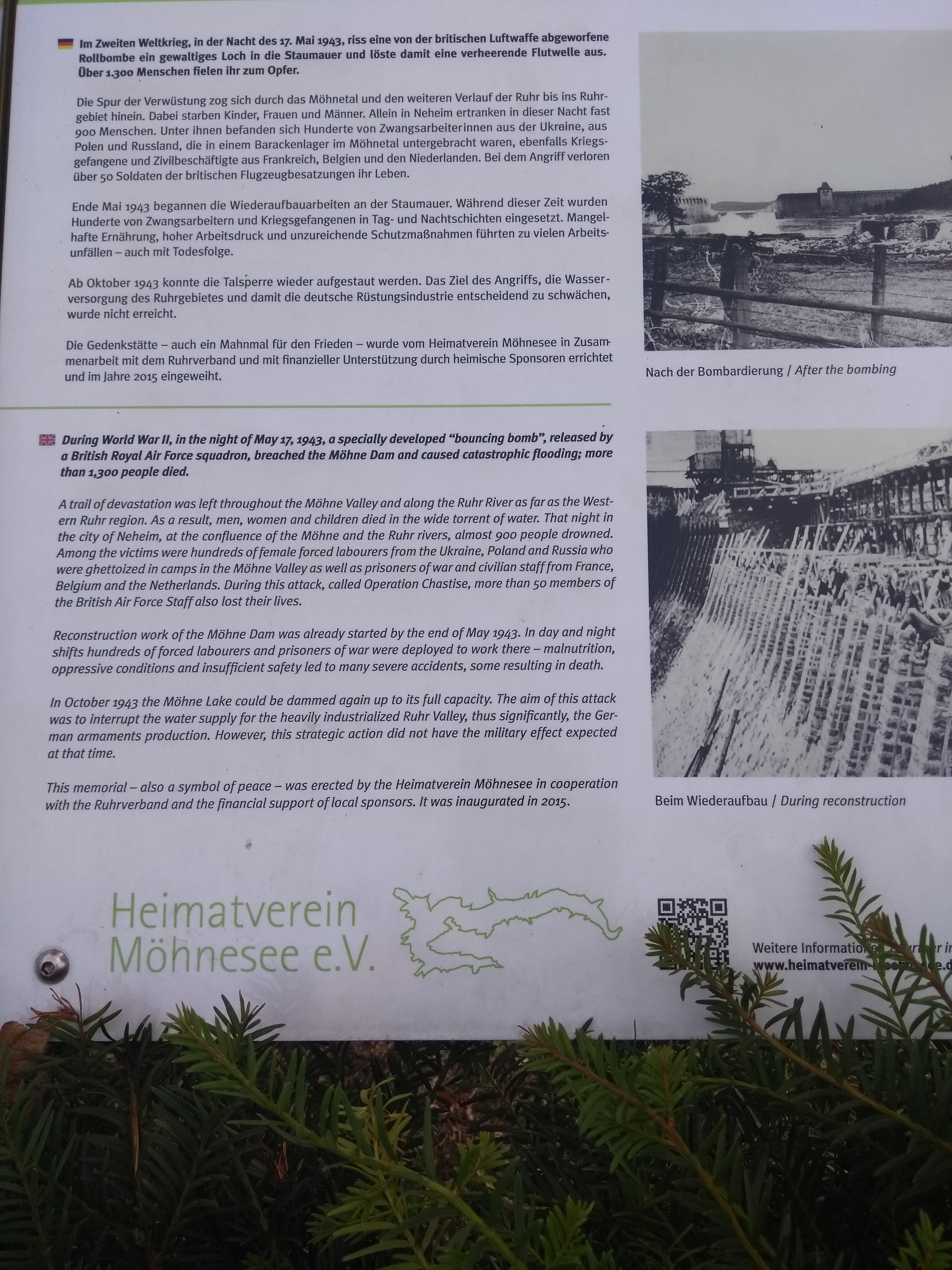
Details in Germany of Operation Chastise at the Möhne dam memorial entrance

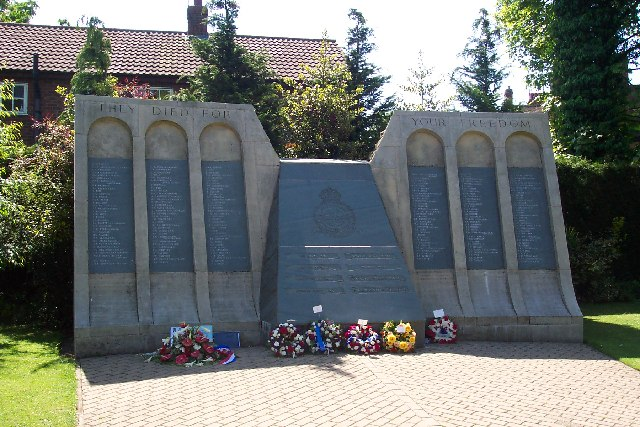
Memorial to Operation Chastise members at Woodhall Spa, Lincolnshire

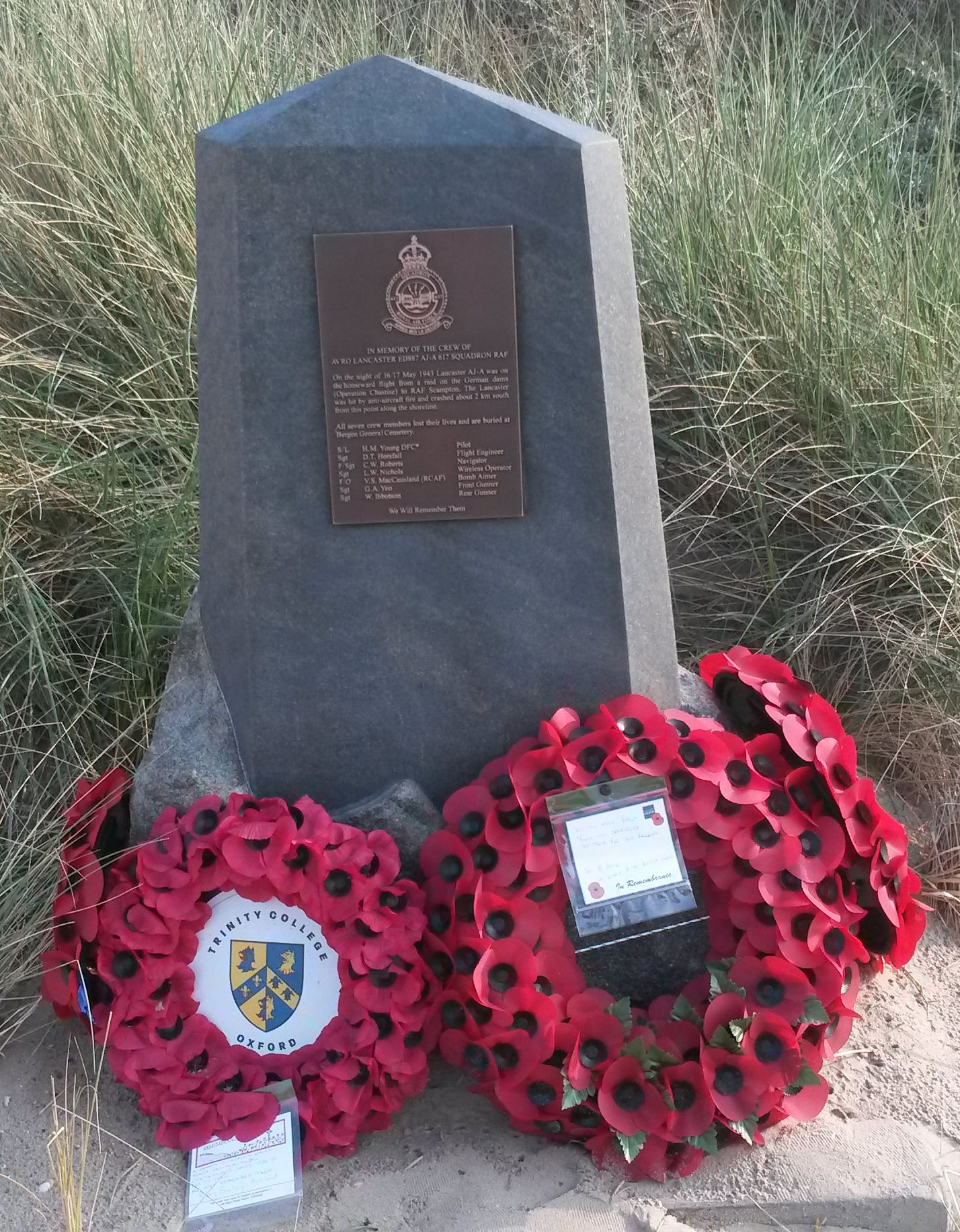
Memorial at Castricum aan Zee

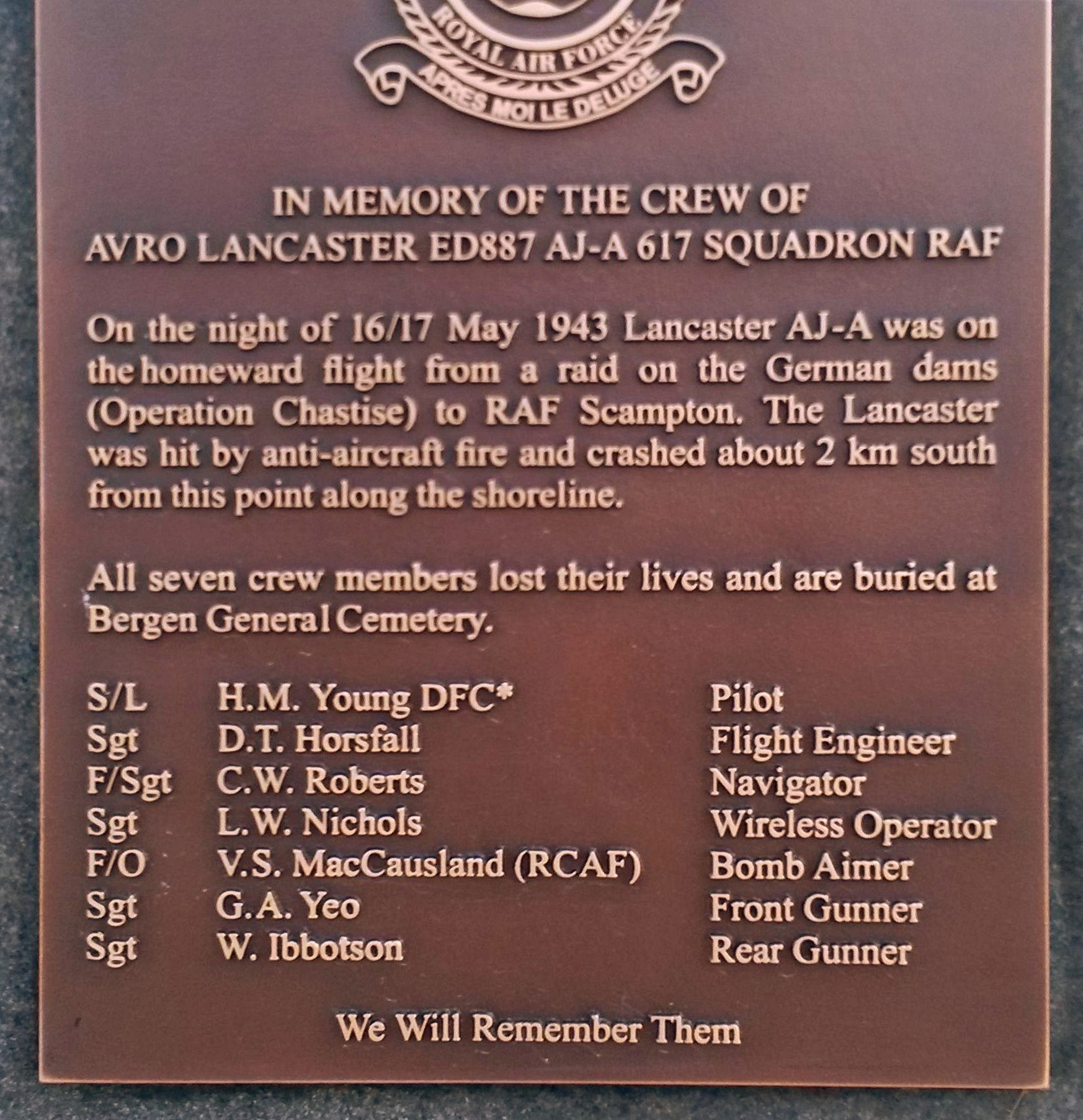
Memorial at Castricum aan Zee

== See also ==
- Attack on the Sui-ho Dam during the Korean War
- Dam failure
- Hydroelectric power station failures
- Operation Eisenhammer, a German plan to wreck critical Soviet hydroelectric turbines in World War II
- Operation Garlic, an attack by 617 Squadron on the Dortmund-Ems Canal
- Proposed bombing of Vietnam's dikes
- Noah Wolff – German Jewish industrialist and philanthropist (1809–1907)
- Destruction of the Kakhovka Dam
