= Joe McCarthy (RCAF officer) =

American Royal Canadian Air Force officer

Joseph Charles McCarthy
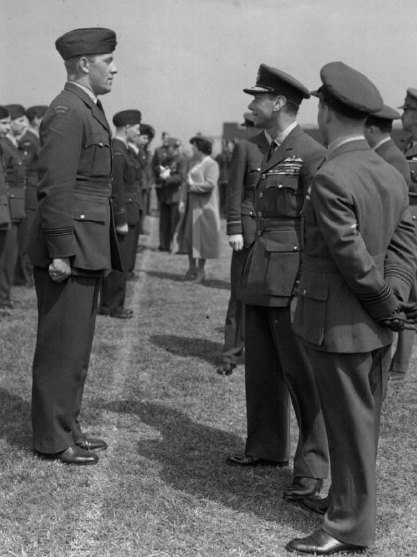
- Joe McCarthy (left) with King George VI and Wing Commander Guy Gibson
- Born: 31 August 1919; St. James, New York, US
- Died: 6 September 1998 (aged 79); Virginia Beach, Virginia, US
- Military career
- Allegiance: Canada
- Branch: Royal Canadian Air Force
- Service years: 1941–c.1968
- Rank: Wing Commander
- Nickname: "Big Joe"
- Unit: No. 617 Squadron RAF
- Commands: 407 Maritime Patrol Squadron; RCAF Test and Development Establishment
- Conflicts: Second World War: Operation Chastise
- Awards: Distinguished Service Order; Distinguished Flying Cross & Bar; Canadian Forces' Decoration

Joseph Charles "Big Joe" McCarthy, DSO, DFC & Bar, CD (31 August 1919 – 6 September 1998) was an American aviator who served with the Royal Canadian Air Force in Bomber Command during World War II. He is best known as the commander and pilot of Lancaster AJ-T ("T-Tommy") in Operation Chastise, the "Dambuster" raid of 1943.

== Early life ==
McCarthy was born in St. James, New York, a town on Long Island east of New York City, and grew up in Brooklyn. As a teenager, he worked as a lifeguard at Coney Island and learned to fly. In May 1941, months before the United States would enter the war, McCarthy joined the Royal Canadian Air Force.

== World War II ==
McCarthy was best known for flying with No. 617 Squadron RAF, including the Dams Raid in 1943. By the time of the raid he had already taken part in thirty bombing sorties over Germany, including three over Berlin. McCarthy and his crew flew with the second wave of Lancasters, but he had to take a spare aircraft after his failed. T-Tommy was the only aircraft of the second wave to attack a target – the Sorpe Dam, which had to be attacked with an Upkeep bomb directly without it bouncing. Despite the bomb hitting the target, the dam was not breached.

He was awarded a Distinguished Flying Cross (DFC) in 1943 for service with No. 97 Squadron RAF, a Distinguished Service Order in the same year for the dams raid, and a Bar to the DFC in 1944.

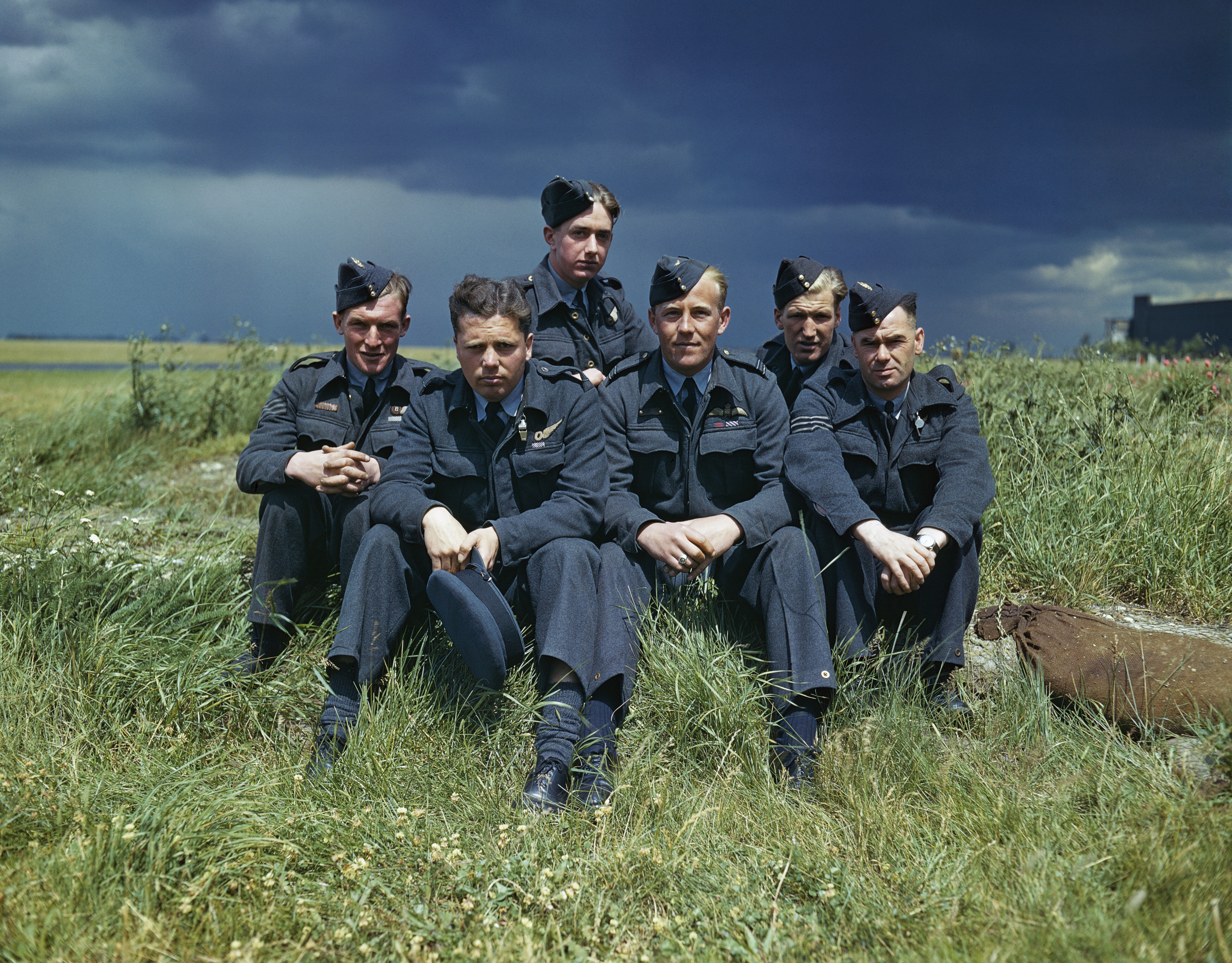
Flight Lieutenant Joe McCarthy (fourth from left) with his crew from Lancaster ED825 'AJ-T' at RAF Scampton, 22 July 1943.

He was mentioned but not portrayed in the 1955 film The Dam Busters, which focuses mostly on the first wave that breached the Möhne and Eder dams.

McCarthy is also fondly mentioned throughout Johnny Johnson's autobiography The Last Dambuster.

== Later life ==
In November 1944, some 18 months after his participation in Operation Chastise, McCarthy was reassigned to the Royal Aircraft Establishment at Farnborough Airfield in Hampshire, England.

Upon the conclusion of World War II, he remained in Farnborough and served with the Foreign Aircraft Flight for several more months, testing and evaluating several dozen ex-Luftwaffe aircraft types including the Arado Ar 232, Dornier Do 335, Focke-Wulf Fw 190 and Fw 200 Condor, and the Heinkel He 219. His first experience of a jet aircraft also took place at Farnborough, where he flight-tested a prototype Mk.4 Gloster Meteor.

After departing the United Kingdom at the end of 1945, McCarthy returned to Canada and obtained his Canadian citizenship the following year.

Through the remainder of the 1940s and 50s, he served as base executive officer at a North American F-86 Sabre-equipped NATO base in France, commanded the RCAF's Test and Development Establishment at the RCAF Aerodrome in Ottawa, Ontario, and became Wing Commander Flying at the No. 4 Flying Training School in Penhold, Alberta. He then flew the Lockheed P-2 Neptune as Commanding Officer of the No. 407 Maritime Reconnaissance Squadron in Comox, British Columbia.

From 1961, he spent 14 months as Chief of Air Operations for the United Nations in the Belgian Congo. In 1963, he started a three-year stint in planning and policy for the United States Navy's Commander-in-Chief, US Atlantic Fleet at Naval Station Norfolk, and from 1966 to 1968 concluded his RCAF career as Base Operations Officer for two squadrons flying the Canadair CP-107 Argus from CFB Greenwood in Greenwood, Nova Scotia.

After leaving Canada for the US in 1969, McCarthy settled in Virginia Beach, Virginia and worked in real estate there through 1986. In retirement, he lectured at Maxwell Air Force Base's Air War College in Montgomery, Alabama.

On 6 September 1998, McCarthy died at his home in the Thoroughgood neighborhood of Virginia Beach.
