= Enemy Coast Ahead =

Autobiography by Guy Gibson

- First edition
- Author: Guy Gibson
- Language: English
- Genre: Autobiography
- Publisher: Michael Joseph
- Publication date: 1946 (Censored); 2003 (Uncensored); 2015 (Ebook)
- Publication place: United Kingdom
- Media type: Print (Paperback); Ebook
- Pages: 288
- ISBN: 978-0-85979-118-2

Enemy Coast Ahead is an autobiographical book recounting the World War II flying career of Wing Commander Guy Gibson VC, DSO, DFC. It covers his time in RAF Bomber Command from the very earliest days of war in 1939 through to 1943.

Gibson wrote the book aged 25 in 1944 whilst off operations. He had by this time completed two full tours, each of 30 operations, with Bomber Command (with 83 and 106 Squadrons), another one as a night-fighter pilot with 29 Squadron and, as leader of the famous Dam Busters raid against the dams of the Ruhr Valley (Operation Chastise) with 617 Squadron in May 1943.

It was first published in book form in 1946, to much critical acclaim and a fully uncensored account released in 2003. The book was serialised in the Sunday Express during the winter of 1944-45, following his death in September 1944, when his Mosquito crashed near Steenbergen in the Netherlands.

== Synopsis ==
Gibson joined the RAF prior to the war, and he recounts the early stages of combat and the daily struggle with first the Handley Page Hampden and then the Avro Manchester aeroplanes on long and arduous missions into enemy airspace. He also clearly recounts the issues facing the early pilots taking the war to Germany from within what seemed an almost amateurish Bomber Command. Subsequently, he flew the renowned Avro Lancaster. He quickly learned how to stay alive and rapidly grew in experience and maturity, rising from Pilot Officer to a highly decorated Wing Commander.

== 2003 reprint ==
Using Gibson's original draft, the reprint restored elements originally omitted – such as Gibson's views on fellow pilots and staff, air tactics and the deployment of Bomber Command.

On the 75th anniversary of Gibson's death, September 19th, 2019, Greenhill Books released a new illustrated edition of the book. The new edition retains the introduction by Sir Arthur Harris and adds new commentary from historian James Holland. In his introduction Holland writes, "He was certainly flawed, but his flaws make his achievements all the more remarkable... read it carefully, and particularly this original draft, and the fears, the stress and strain, and the tragedy of his short life are there, plain to see."

The Greenhill edition also includes extensive notes by Dr Robert Owen, official historian of 617 Squadron and more than 100 photographs, many of which had not been published elsewhere before.

== Film ==
The 1955 film, The Dam Busters, was based on both Gibson's Enemy Coast Ahead and on Paul Brickhill's The Dam Busters. The movie starred Richard Todd as Gibson and Michael Redgrave as Wallis.
