= Edersee Dam =

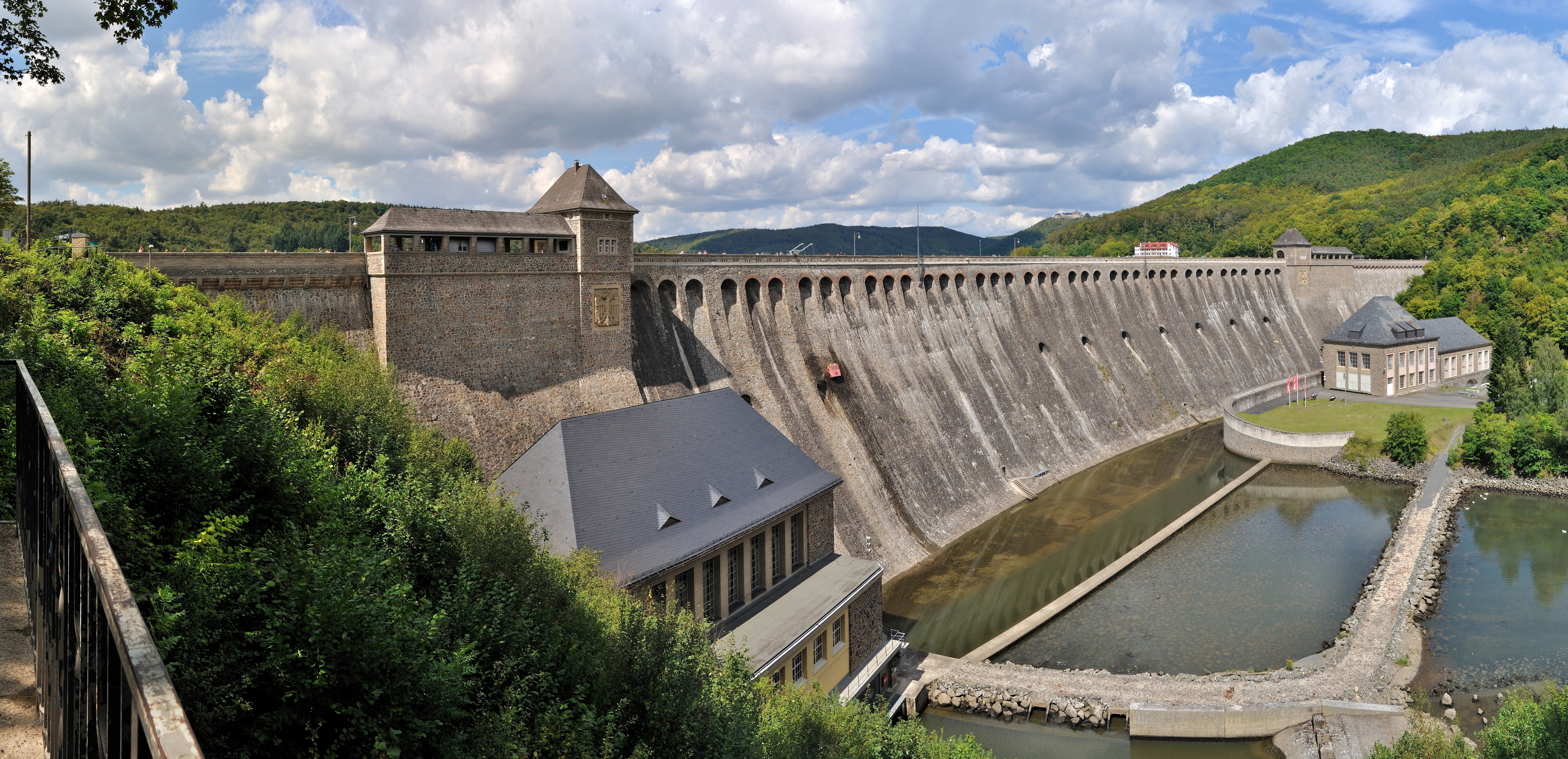

- Location within Germany
- Country: Germany
- Location: Waldeck-Frankenberg, Hesse
- Coordinates: 51°11′00″N 09°03′32″E
- Construction began: 1908
- Opening date: 1914

Dam and spillways
- Type of dam: Gravity dam
- Impounds: Eder
- Height: 48 m (157 ft)
- Length: 400 m (1,312 ft)
- Width (crest): 6 m (20 ft)
- Width (base): 36 m (118 ft)
- Dam volume: 300,000 m^{3} (10,594,400 ft^{3})
- Spillway capacity: 1,774 m^{3}/s (62,648.2 cu ft/s)

Reservoir
- Creates: Edersee
- Total capacity: 199,300,000 m^{3} (7.038213078×10^{9} ft^{3})
- Catchment area: 1,443 km^{2} (557 mi^{2})
- Surface area: 11.8 km^{2} (4.6 mi^{2})
- Maximum water depth: 41.7 m (137 ft)

Power Station
- Operator: 16.9 m
- Type: Conventional
- Hydraulic head: 45 m (148 ft)
- Installed capacity: 21MW

The Edersee Dam is a hydroelectric dam spanning the Eder river in northern Hesse, Germany. Constructed between 1908 and 1914, it lies near the small town of Waldeck at the northern edge of the Kellerwald. Breached by Allied bombs during World War II, it was rebuilt during the war, and today generates hydroelectric power and regulates water levels for shipping on the Weser river.

At low water in late summers of dry years, the remnants of three villages (Asel, Bringhausen, and Berich) and a bridge across the original riverbed submerged when the lake was filled in 1914 can be seen. Descendants of those buried there go to visit the graves of their ancestors.

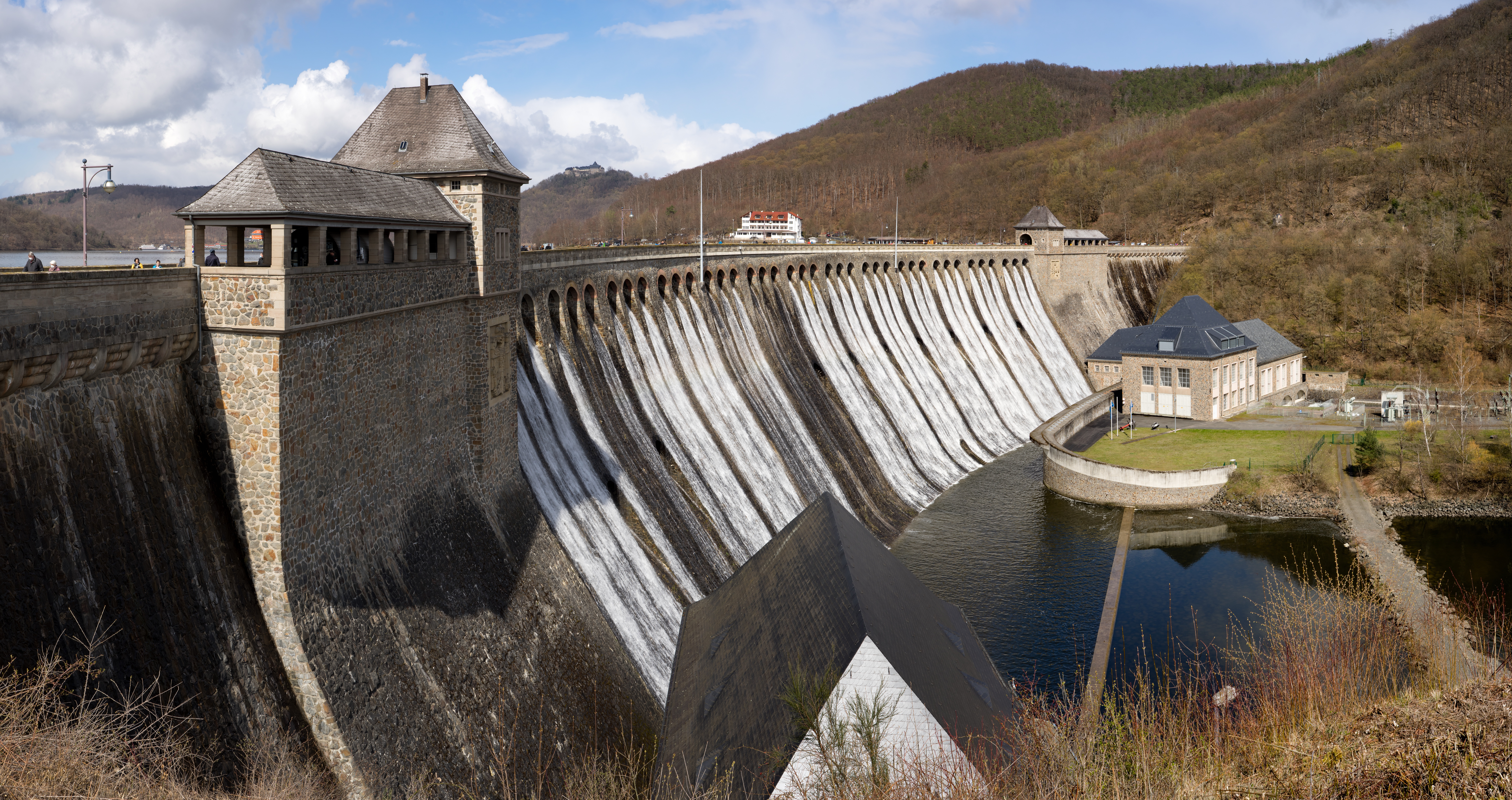
Overflowing Edersee Dam in spring 2021

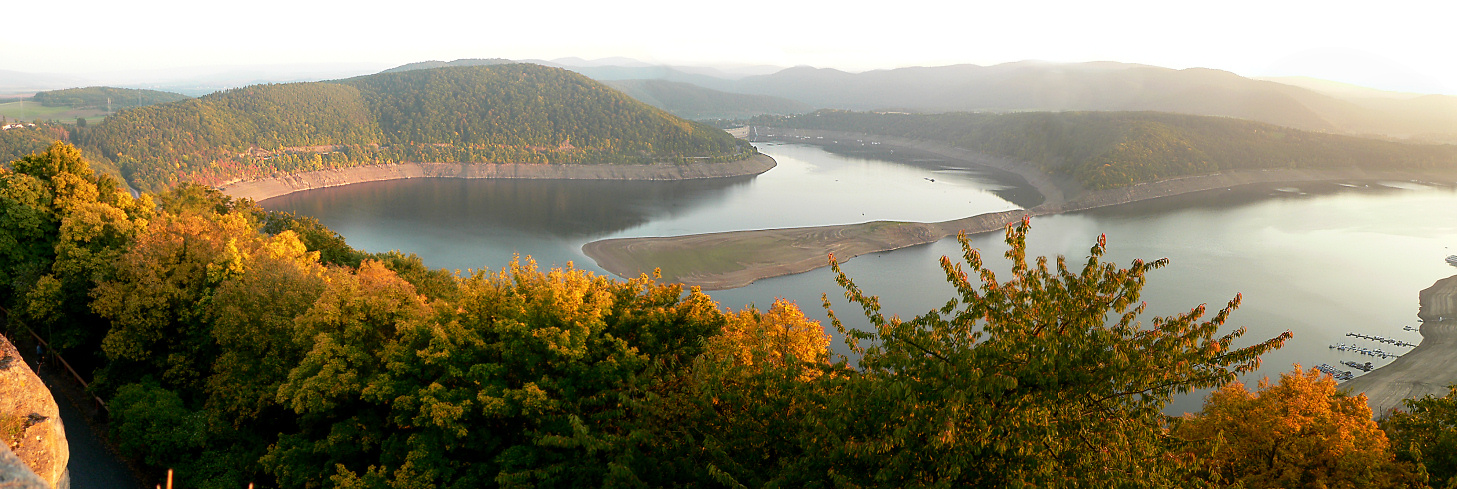
The Edersee today (low water level)

== World War II ==
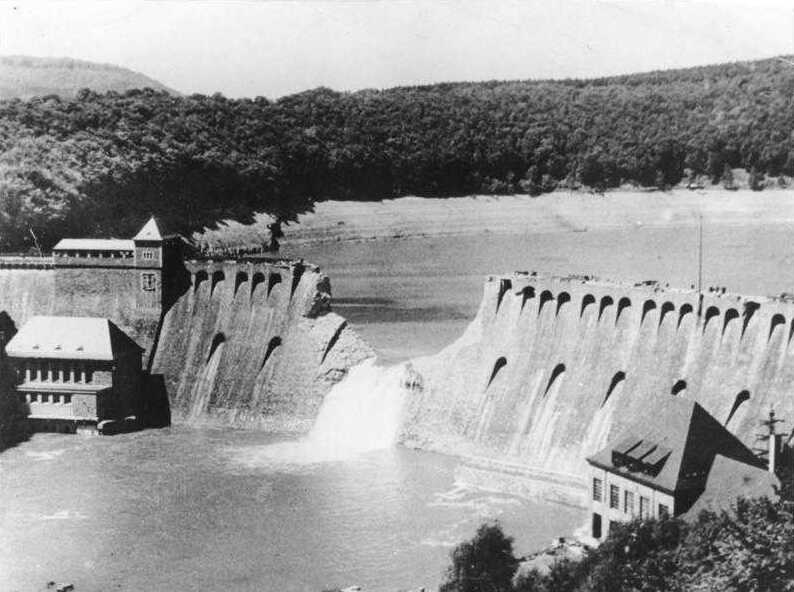
The breached Eder Dam on 17 May 1943

The dam was breached in World War II by bouncing bombs dropped by British Lancaster bombers of No. 617 Squadron RAF as part of Operation Chastise. The early morning raid of 17 May 1943 created a massive 70 metres (230 ft) wide and 22 metres (72 ft) deep breach in the structure. Water emptied at a rate of 8,000 cubic metres per second (280,000 cu ft/s) into the narrow valley below, producing a 6–8-metre (20–26 ft) flood wave which roared as far as 30 kilometres (19 mi) downstream. By the time it diminished in the widening floodplains of the lower Eder, into the Fulda and into the Weser, a total of about 160 cubic meters per hectare had flowed, wreaking widespread destruction and claiming the lives of some 70 people.

(Some non-German sources erroneously cite an early total of 749 for all foreigners killed in all POW and labour camps downriver of the Möhne dam as casualties at a supposed POW or labour camp just below the Eder Dam.)

The dam was rebuilt within months by forced labour drawn from construction of the Atlantic Wall under command of Organisation Todt. The lake today is the third largest reservoir in Germany. Its capacity of 199.3 million m^{3} (161,600 acre⋅ft) makes it a major summertime recreational facility.

The 1955 film The Dam Busters chronicled the British attack on the dam.

The 2003 video game Call of Duty has a playable level of the dam.

== See also ==
- List of hydroelectric power station failures
- Möhne Reservoir
