= Jackie Moggridge =

Pioneering aviation pilot

- Born: Dolores Theresa Sorour; 1 March 1922; Pretoria, South Africa
- Died: 7 January 2004 (aged 81)
- Known for: First woman airline captain

Jackie Moggridge (born Dolores Theresa Sorour; 1 March 1922 – 7 January 2004) was a pioneering pilot, the first woman to do a parachute jump in South Africa and the first female airline captain of scheduled passenger services.

== Early life ==
Born Dolores Theresa Sorour in Pretoria, South Africa, she decided to call herself Jackie after her sports heroine Jackie Rissik who was famous at the time for playing hockey. She learned to fly and got her ‘A’ flying licence, starting to fly aged fifteen. She became the first woman to do a parachute jump in South Africa aged seventeen. She moved to the United Kingdom in 1938 with the intention of getting her ‘B’ flying licence with the Aeronautical College, Witney, Oxford.

== Second World War service ==
Like many women interested in flying for the war effort, she joined the Women's Auxiliary Air Force until she could join the Air Transport Auxiliary (ATA). Initially she was based in Rye at a radar station. She was recruited to the ATA by the Women's Commandant, Pauline Gower in July 1940. Moggridge was the youngest of the female pilots at the time. She flew more than 1,500 aircraft of 83 different types.

Jackie Moggridge was awarded the King's Commendation for Valuable Service in the Air in 1945.

== Post-war ==
Dolores Theresa "Jackie" Sorour married army Lieut. Colonel and engineer, Reginald Moggridge, in Taunton, Somerset in 1945, with whom she had two daughters. She was involved with the local amateur dramatics societies but still wanted to fly.

In 1949 she was commissioned into the Women's RAF Volunteer Reserve (WRAFVR), as a Pilot Officer, and qualified for her RAF wings in 1953, the second of the first five women to gain their RAF wings. As a result of her involvement in both amateur dramatics and the RAF Reserve, Moggridge was interviewed in 1950 by Richard Dimbleby for his radio show Down Your Way.

Moggridge went on to gain her commercial pilot's licence in the 1950s, and ferried Spitfires from Cyprus to Rangoon, to the Indian Air Force and to Burma, before looking for more flying opportunities. In 1957 she worked for LEC Refrigeration, co-piloting demonstration versions of their fridges to South Africa for potential customers to view, a trip of 15,000 miles.

In 1958 she applied to be a pilot with Channel Airways, based at Southend Airport, without stating her sex. She was appointed due to her impressive flying record, becoming the first British female airline captain to fly passengers on scheduled flights. Over time, she worked the Isle of Wight, Jersey and Guernsey routes.

== Awards and legacy ==
For her war-service, the recently married First Officer Moggridge was awarded the King's Commendation for Valuable Service in the Air, in addition to campaign medals. In 1953 she was awarded the Coronation medal, not a universal issue at the time, and therefore a further recognition of merit.

Moggridge was awarded the Jean Lennox Bird Trophy by the British Women Pilots’ Association in 1959, for furthering the cause of women in aviation, she accepted the award saying "I long for a time when being a woman Captain would be commonplace".

She created the Jackie Moggridge Cup, which is awarded to a British woman pilot for achieving excellent qualifications. In addition to the BWPA Jackie Moggridge Cup, a new trophy to be awarded annually in her memory to inspire girls to fly, was introduced in 2021. The RAF Jackie Moggridge Spitfire Award was presented by Princess Anne at Cranwell College to an Engineer or Aircrew Graduate who has shown outstanding potential.

Jackie Moggridge wrote a book about her experiences, originally published in 1957 as Woman pilot, now republished as Spitfire Girl – My Life in the Sky (Head of Zeus).

Her daughter Candy Adkins gives talks in schools and societies on Jackie Moggridge's life during WW2 and beyond to ensure that pioneering women who were airbrushed out of the history books are not forgotten, and to inspire girls into aviation.

== First five women to gain RAF wings in early 1950s ==
Jean Bird, Benedetta Willis, Jackie Moggridge, Freydis Leaf and Joan Hughes were the first five women to be awarded their wings. The next did not gain RAF wings until Julie Ann Gibson 1991.

== Sources ==
- "Jackie Moggridge". solentaviatrix. 30 May 2014.
- "Jackie Moggridge: Air Transport Auxiliary Pilot – Blog". RAF Museum. 17 March 2018.
- "OBITUARY: Jackie Moggridge, 1922–2004". South African Military History Society. 28 October 2007.
- "Moggridge, Jackie (Oral history)". Imperial War Museums.
- "Dolores Theresa ('Jackie') Moggridge (née Sorour) – Person". National Portrait Gallery. 17 March 1953.
- Dickens, Peter (9 August 2017). "South African Battle of Britain Heroine -Jackie Moggridge". The Observation Post.
- "Housewife pilot memoir republished". BBC News. 4 July 2014.
- "Journal – war service of Jackie Moggridge, 1939–1945". South African Military History Society. 24 June 1938.* "SAWIA_Womens Month_2012_2 August". samilitaryhistory.org. 1 August 2012.
- www.jackiemoggridgespitfiregirl.com Official Jackie Moggridge website launched by daughter Candida 30.03.21
