= Jean Bird =

Pioneering woman pilot

- Pilot licence photo
- Born: Jean Lennox Bird; 8 July 1912; Hong Kong
- Died: 29 April 1957 (aged 44); Manchester, England
- Known for: Pioneering pilot

Jean Lennox Bird (8 July 1912 – 29 April 1957) was a pioneering pilot and the first woman to be awarded RAF wings.

== Early life ==
Jean Lennox Bird was born in Hong Kong on 8 July 1912, the second daughter of Lt Col. Lennox Godfrey Bird, an architect who designed several buildings in Hong Kong and Shanghai. Her father retired in 1935, and the family returned home, eventually settling at the Old Farm, in Beech, near Alton, Hampshire England.

Bird started flying at the age of eighteen and took lessons, alongside her father, at the Hampshire Aeroplane Club in Hamble, during a visit home. Both qualified on 2 October 1930.

== War service ==
By the time Second World War broke out in 1939 Bird was an experienced pilot. She was commissioned into the Women's Auxiliary Air Force (WAAF) as Assistant Section Officer (ASO) in 1940 and remained there for a year until invited to join the ATA.

Bird joined the Air Transport Auxiliary (ATA) on 1 August 1941 and soon qualified as a First Officer. The aircraft she ferried included: Hurricanes, Spitfires, Wellingtons, Beaufighters, Mosquitos and Dakotas. She served with the ATA until the organisation closed down at the end of the war, on 30 November 1945.

== Post-war ==
In 1946, Bird piloted a single-engine air taxi from Durban, South Africa to Britain to help a young bride attend her wedding in Croydon.

In September 1949 Bird was commissioned into the Women's RAF Volunteer Reserve (WRAFVR), as a Pilot Officer, as were a number of the ATA women pilots. During their 5-year commissions, several women took up the opportunity to become fully qualified RAF pilots and Bird duly became the first woman ever to wear the flying badge of an RAF Pilot: the 'Wings'. She was awarded her wings, amid some publicity, at Redhill Aerodrome on 20 September 1952. By the time she qualified, Bird had 3,000 hours in more than 90 different types of aircraft.

The next target was to gain membership of the all-male RAF Club in Piccadilly. Pilot Officer Bird's application was apparently successful, but membership was rejected when this officer's gender was discovered.

When the force was re-established during the Cold War, Bird then became a member, from December 1955, of the 3rd Hants (Alton) Battalion of the Home Guard, one of 16 women to do so. She also worked with the Women's Junior Air Corps, training young women to fly, and was also a glider pilot.

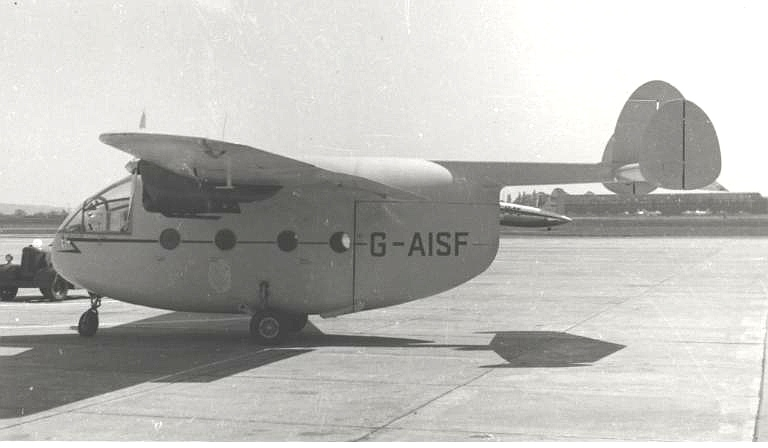
The Meridian Air Maps Miles Aerovan

Bird's main occupation in the 1950s was in the developing field of photographic aerial survey, working for Meridian Air Maps. On 29 April 1957, she was surveying the proposed route of a new road, when her 'Aerovan' twin-engined freight plane crashed and she was killed. The coroner's verdict was accidental death, although evidence was given that the aircraft had been fitted with an incorrect spare part.

Bird is commemorated by the Jean Lennox Bird Trophy of the British Women Pilots' Association. This Chinese antique, a carving in jade to recall her early flying-days in Hong Kong, is awarded annually to a British woman pilot who has also made a noteworthy contribution to aviation.

== First five ==
Jean Bird, Benedetta Willis, Jackie Moggridge, Freydis Leaf and Joan Hughes were the first five women to be awarded their wings. The next to gain wings was Julie Ann Gibson in 1991.

== Sources ==
- "To the memory of a flying pioneer". Alton Herald. 12 August 2018. Archived from the original on 13 June 2020.
- Harrison, Beverley (April 2017). "Jean Lennox Bird – a vital link in women's aviation history" (PDF). BWPA.
- Ministry of Defence (19 September 2017). "Bird of a different feather: The first female pilot to receive RAF wings". Medium.
- Goldman, L. (2013). Oxford Dictionary of National Biography 2005-2008. ODNB Print Series. OUP Oxford. ISBN 978-0-19-967154-0.
- Ferguson, N. (2017). For the Love of the Air Force: A Celebration of the British Armed Forces. Summersdale Publishers Limited. ISBN 978-1-78685-414-8.
- Brown, P.C. (2017). Manchester Airport Through Time. Amberley Publishing. ISBN 978-1-4456-6391-3.
- Doughan, D.; Gordon, P. (2007). Women, Clubs and Associations in Britain. Routledge Research in Gender and History. Taylor & Francis. ISBN 978-1-134-20437-3.
- Walker, D.B. (2008). Spreading My Wings: One of Britain's Top Women Pilots Tells Her Remarkable Story from Pre-War Flying to Breaking the Sound Barrier. Grub Street Publishing. ISBN 978-1-908117-65-6.
- "First R.A.F. Wings For Women AKA 1st Woman Gets RAF Wings 1952". British Pathe.
- "Bird, Jean Lennox (1912-1957) first woman pilot in the RAF". The National Archives. 18 December 2008.
- "The RAF 100 Schools Project". The RAF 100 Schools Project. 1 September 2017.
