= Charles Leaf =

British sailor

- Born: Charles Symonds Leaf; 13 November 1895; Marylebone
- Died: 19 February 1947 (aged 51)
- Education: Harrow School
- Alma mater: Trinity College, Cambridge
- Children: 3 Derek Leaf DSC with bar, Freydis Sharland, Robin Leaf
- Military career
- Allegiance: United Kingdom
- Branch: British Army; Royal Marines
- Service years: 1914–1918; 1943–1945
- Rank: Lieutenant
- Conflicts: First World War; Second World War

Olympic medal record

Sailing
Gold medal – first place	1936 Berlin	6 metre class

Charles Symonds Leaf, FSA (13 November 1895 – 19 February 1947) was a British sailor who competed in the 1936 Summer Olympics. He contributed to the design and build of the Merlin Rocket sailing dinghy.

== Biography ==
Leaf was educated at Harrow School, an all-boys independent boarding school, and at Trinity College, Cambridge.

Leaf was an amateur archaeologist. On 11 January 1934, he was elected a Fellow of the Society of Antiquaries (FSA). He donated the majority of his archaeological finds to the Fitzwilliam Museum, Cambridge.

In 1936 he was a crew member of the British boat Lalage which won the gold medal in the 6 metre class.

On 22 August 1917, Leaf married Catherine Blanche Kay-Shuttleworth, daughter of Ughtred Kay-Shuttleworth, 1st Baron Shuttleworth. They had two children. Their daughter Freydis Sharland went on to be an Air Transport Auxiliary pilot during the Second World War and one of the first women to qualify for RAF wings.

=== Military service ===
Leaf served in the British Army during the First World War. On 18 October 1914, he was commissioned as a second lieutenant in the 5th (Territorial Force) Battalion, Buffs (East Kent Regiment). He was promoted to temporary lieutenant on 22 January 1916. He was seconded to the Machine Gun Corps (MGC) on 3 April 1917. He was promoted to substantive lieutenant on 12 May 1917 with seniority in that rank from 1 June 1916. He ceased to be employed by the MGC on 30 December 1918, and rejoined his regiment the same day.

He served in the Royal Marines during the Second World War. He was commissioned in the Royal Marines as a probationary temporary lieutenant on 21 June 1943. His commission was confirmed on 21 December 1943 and he became a temporary lieutenant. His commission was terminated on 27 July 1945.
