= Freydís (name) =

Freydís or Freydis is a given name. People with the name include:

- Freydís Eiríksdóttir, Icelandic colonist.
- Freydís Halla Einarsdóttir, Icelandic alpine ski racer.
- Freydis Sharland, pioneering female pilot.
