= National Association of Training Corps for Girls =

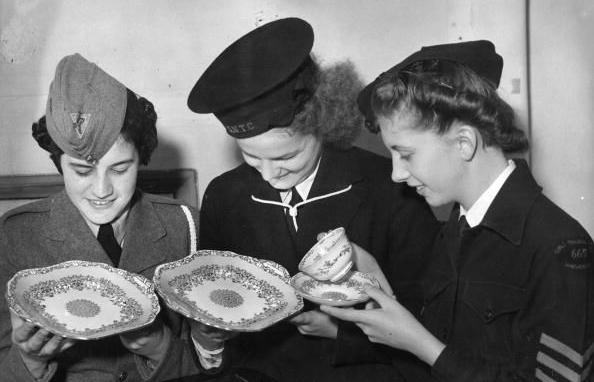
Members of the Women's Junior Air Corps, Girls' Nautical Training Corps, and Girls Training Corps during the 1940s.

The National Association of Training Corps for Girls (NATCG; initially the National Association of Girls' Training Corps (NAGTC)) was formed in the United Kingdom in 1942 by the then Board of Education. It was the umbrella organisation for the 'Girls Training Corps' (GTC), the 'Girls' Nautical Training Corps' (GNTC), and the 'Women's Junior Air Corps' (WJAC), which had all formed in the years prior.

== Girls Training Corps ==
The first Girls Training Corps (GTC) units were formed in 1941. The GTC's purpose, as with other cadet organisations at the time, was to prepare young people for service to their community, and to support in the war effort upon reaching adulthood. For the Girls Training Corps, this meant training in military drill in preparation for potentially serving in the Auxiliary Territorial Service. The GTC was open to girls aged 14 to 20, and its motto was 'To serve and Train for Service'.

Activities included learning to act as bicycle couriers, learning morse code, aircraft recognition, gymnastics, homemaking, craft-work, public affairs, land navigation, learning first aid, marksmanship, firefighting, and assisting with air warden duties. During the war and after, GTC companies and members were active in volunteering in the community, such as volunteering as 'sitter-ins' in hospitals.

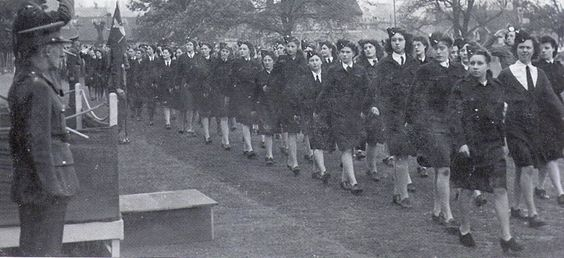
The Farnborough Girls Training Corps in 1944.

The GTC were organised into local units called companies, led by an adult Commandant, these companies would sometimes join other cadet units for joint training. Companies were then grouped into areas led by an Area Commandant. Within a year of forming, over 120,000 girls had joined a GTC company. Unlike their male counterparts, members of the GTC had to provide their own uniforms using clothing coupons. The uniform consisted of black shoes, navy blue skirt, white blouse, navy blue tie, GTC badge, and a navy blue forage hat.

It was planned that after the War, the GTC would be wound down and disbanded. Whilst there was a significant drop in the number of members, there were enough to change the decision to disband the GTC. After the war, following advice from the Youth Advisory Council, there was greater emphasis in the GTC training programme to recognise the girls as "a potential wife and mother". Over 3,000 members of the GTC took part in a parade at the Royal Tournament in 1951. In 1955, Princess Alexandra became patron of the National Association of Training Corps for Girls. In 1964, the GTC and WJAC amalgamated to become the Girls Venture Corps (GVC).

== Girl's Nautical Training Corps ==
Girl's Nautical Training Corps officers cap badge.

The Girl's Nautical Training Corps (GNTC) was formed in 1942, for girls aged 14 to 20, with the majority of units formed near coastal areas in Southern England. It provided training in Royal Navy drill and seamanship, preparing girls for service in the Women's Royal Naval Service (WRNS), similar to the training and aims of the Sea Cadet Corps (SCC).

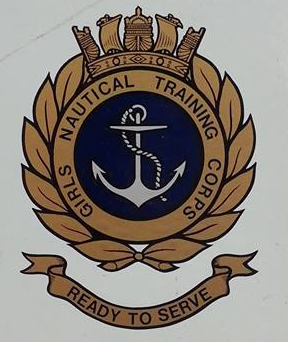
Girls' Nautical Training Corps badge.

The Girls' Naval Training Corps numbered 50 units in 1952, and in the late 1950s, changed their name to the 'Girls' Nautical Training Corps'. Lady Pamela Mountbatten was Corps Commandant of the GNTC from around 1952 to around 1959.

The GNTC became a colleague organisation with the Sea Cadet Corps in 1963, often sharing facilities such as Raven's Ait (then also known as TS Neptune). The GNTC became a full member of the Sea Cadet Organisation in March 1980, when the Ministry of Defence approved the admission of girls into the Sea Cadets, this led to a name change to Girls Nautical Training Contingent. This continued until 1992 when the organisation was absorbed, and all girls became members of the Sea Cadet Corps.

== Women's Junior Air Corps ==
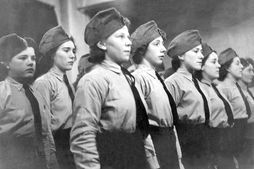
Women's Junior Air Corps in the Second World War.

The Women's Junior Air Corps (WJAC) did not, initially, receive official support from the Air Ministry, but the Air Ministry did give guidance on ranks, badges, and uniform. The uniform was modelled on that of the Royal Air Force (RAF) and Women's Auxiliary Air Force (WAAF) and consisted of: black shoes, Air Force blue skirt, grey shirt, black tie, WJAC badge, and a grey forage hat. The WJAC was formed in 1939, with larger towns and cities often hosting multiple units. The WJAC provided training and activities in similar areas as the GTC and GNTC, including drill, morse code, marksmanship, physical training, first aid, motor maintenance, and aircraft recognition. Optional training courses included anti-aircraft operational duties, radio location, signals, engineering and electrical work, and clerical and office duties. The core and optional training available were used to prepare girls for service in the Women's Auxiliary Air Force and the Air Transport Auxiliary (ATA). Both WJAC and the GTC were also active in supporting local governments in areas such as health initiatives, an example being providing vitamins to school children. Many units also formed bands who would perform in parades and services. They were also provided with a limited number of aircraft, such as the Fairchild Argus II, to provide pleasure flights and basic flight instruction.

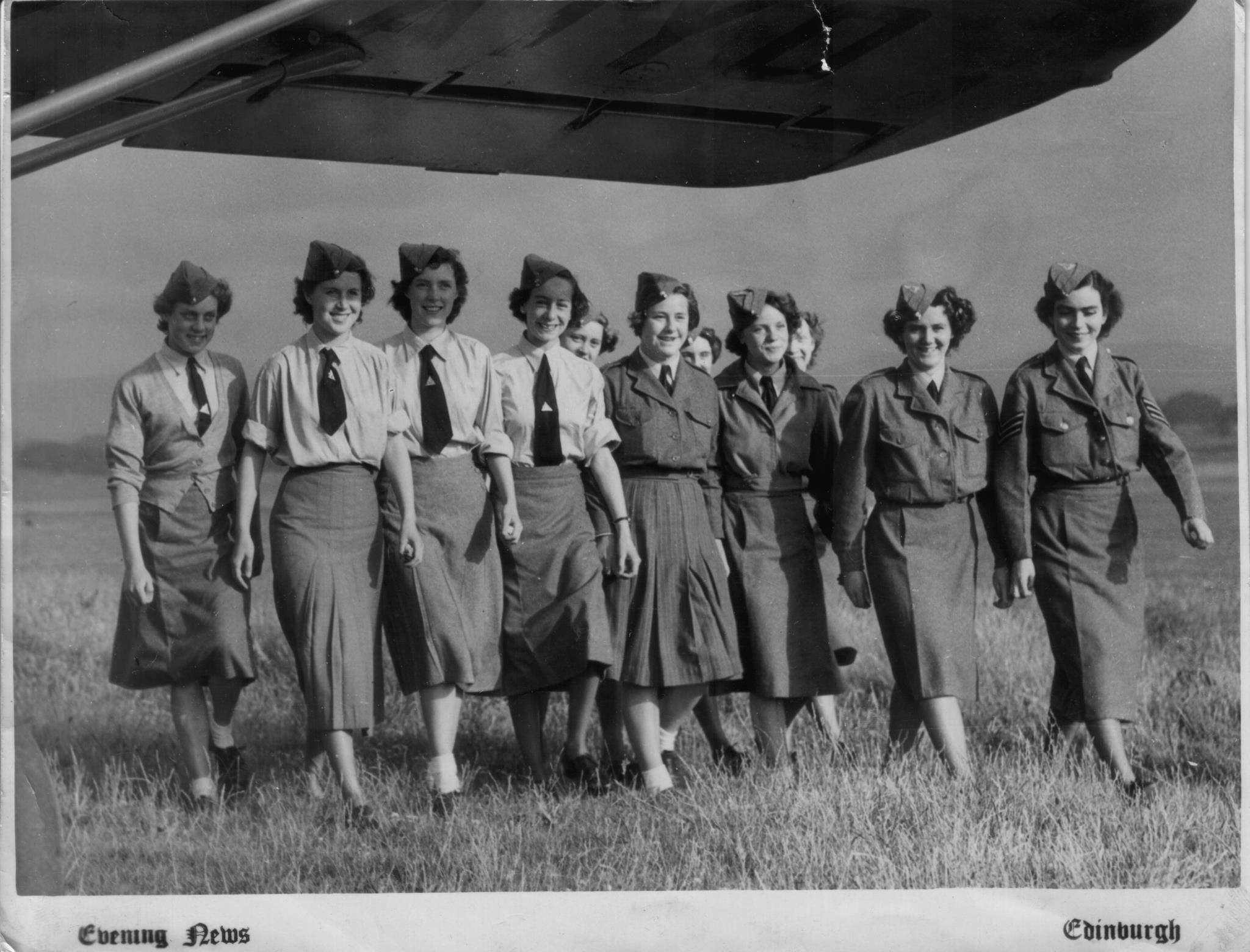
Edinburgh-based Womens Junior Air Corps members in the 1950s.

After the War, WJAC continued with many of the same activities, including supporting the community in health initiatives. In 1956, the WJAC expanded its activities to include riding, gliding, and driving lessons. Even into the 1960s, the WJAC still had to purchase their own uniforms. In 1964, The GTC and WJAC amalgamated to become the Girls Venture Corps, with the addition of 'Air Cadets' added to their title in 1987.

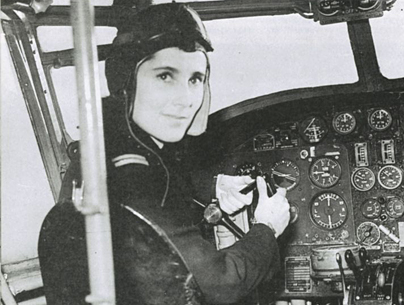
Diana Barnato Walker serving with the Air Transport Auxiliary.

Many famous female pilots were officers in the Women's Junior Air Corp, including:

- Diana Barnato Walker, ATA pilot, and the first British woman to break the sound barrier
- Freydis Sharland, ATA pilot and founding chairwoman of the British Women Pilots' Association (BWPA)
- Gabrielle Patterson, ATA pilot and WJAC Commandant, 1946-1950
- Jean Bird, first woman to be awarded RAF wings, flying instructor in the WJAC.

=== Ranks ===
Women's Junior Air Corps cadet ranks and insignia
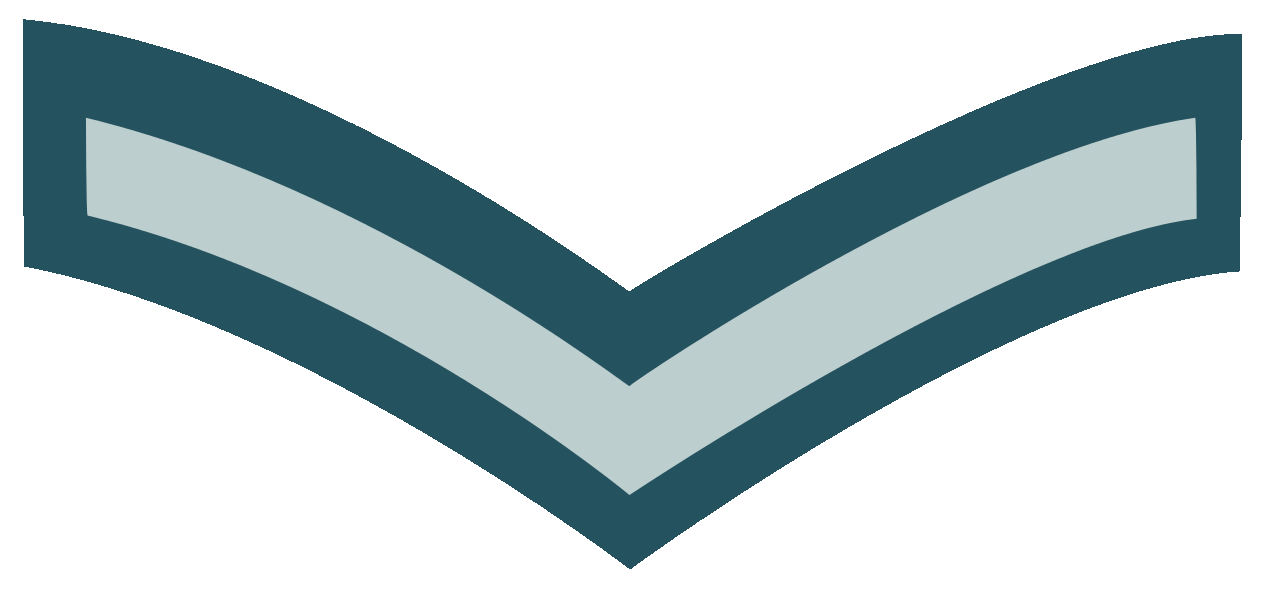
Women's Junior Air Corps
Women's Junior Air Corps	Cadet unit sergeant	Cadet sergeant	Cadet corporal	Cadet lance corporal	Cadet
Women's Junior Air Corps	CDTUSGT	CDTSGT	CDTCPL	CDTLCPL	CDT

== Girls Venture Corps ==
In 1964, the Girls Training Corps (GTC) and Women's Junior Air Corps (WJAC) amalgamated to become the Girls Venture Corps (GVC), which had two wings corresponding to the former Girls Training Corps (Ground Wing) and Women's Junior Air Corps (Air Wing); it was common at this time for former GTC units to share premises with Army Cadet Force (ACF) units, and for former WJAC units to share premises with Air Training Corps (ATC) units. At this time, a new uniform was designed by Norman Hartnell, with a variant for each wing. From 1983, girls were accepted into the ACF and ATC, which caused many GVC cadets to transfer to their respective counterparts. It was decided that the GVC would focus on air activities, and in 1987 at the request of its membership, the organisation was renamed the Girls Venture Corps Air Cadets (GVCAC).

== See also ==
- Navy League Wrennette Corps — Canadian equivalent of the Girls' Nautical Training Corps
