= Women's RAF Volunteer Reserve =

- Country: United Kingdom
- Allegiance: Queen Elizabeth II
- Branch: Royal Air Force
- Type: Volunteer Reserve

Insignia
- RAF Ensign

The Women's RAF Volunteer Reserve (WRAFVR) was a military reserve force for the Royal Air Force. It was for women and the first pilot to receive wings was the Air Transport Auxiliary veteran, Veronica Volkersz.

== Notable members ==
- Joy Ferguson
- Jackie Moggridge
- Freydis Sharland
- Vera Strodl Dowling
- Veronica Volkersz
- Benedetta Willis

== See also ==
- RAF Volunteer Reserve
- Royal Air Force Volunteer Reserve (Training Branch)
