= Benedetta Willis =

One of the first women RAF pilots to get her wings

- Benedetta Willis with a Hurricane
- Born: Benedetta Willis; 25 January 1914; Famagusta, Cyprus
- Died: December 2008 (aged 94); Bembridge, Isle of Wight
- Known for: RAF pilot

Benedetta Willis (born Benedetta Day; 25 January 1914 – December 2008) was one of the first women RAF pilots to get her wings.

== Life ==
Benedetta Day was born in 1914 in Famagusta, Cyprus. She came to the UK when she was ten. A lifelong interest in flying lead her to the Insurance Flying Club in London. Her husband, Charles Henry Willis, was an instructor there when they met. They married in 1938 and started a family. They also bought a plane. Willis worked as an architect's assistant.

When World War II began her husband joined up and encouraged his wife to join the Air Transport Auxiliary. Willis became a First Officer when she joined up on 1 September 1941. She left Air Transport Auxiliary on 3 August 1943, a year after flying her first Spitfire because she was pregnant. She went on to have a total of four children.

In 1949 she was commissioned into the Women's RAF Volunteer Reserve (WRAFVR), as a Pilot Officer. During her 5-year commission, Willis trained to become a RAF-qualified pilot and was duly awarded the RAF pilot's flying badge, or 'Wings', on 18 August 1953.

She and her husband retired to Bembridge, Isle of Wight. Charles Willis died in 1990 aged 81. Willis herself died in 2008.

== First five ==
Jean Bird, Benedetta Willis, Jackie Moggridge, Freydis Leaf and Joan Hughes were the first five women to qualify as pilots of the RAF. All qualified in the early 1950s, as officers of WRAFVR, and were awarded the standard 'Wings' of an RAF pilot. There was a gap of nearly four decades until the next woman, Julie Ann Gibson, a regular officer of the WRAF, qualified in 1991.
