= Anne-Marie Houghton =

Group Captain Anne-Marie Houghton OBE (née Dawe; born 26 August 1968) is an RAF officer and was the RAF's first female fully qualified navigator in 1991.

== Early life ==
She was born in Barnstaple in north Devon. She was born on the day before that of Jo Salter, the RAF's first female fast-jet pilot. She was brought up in Hornchurch, in Greater London. She has an older brother and two younger brothers.

She was head girl at her school.

== Career ==
=== RAF ===
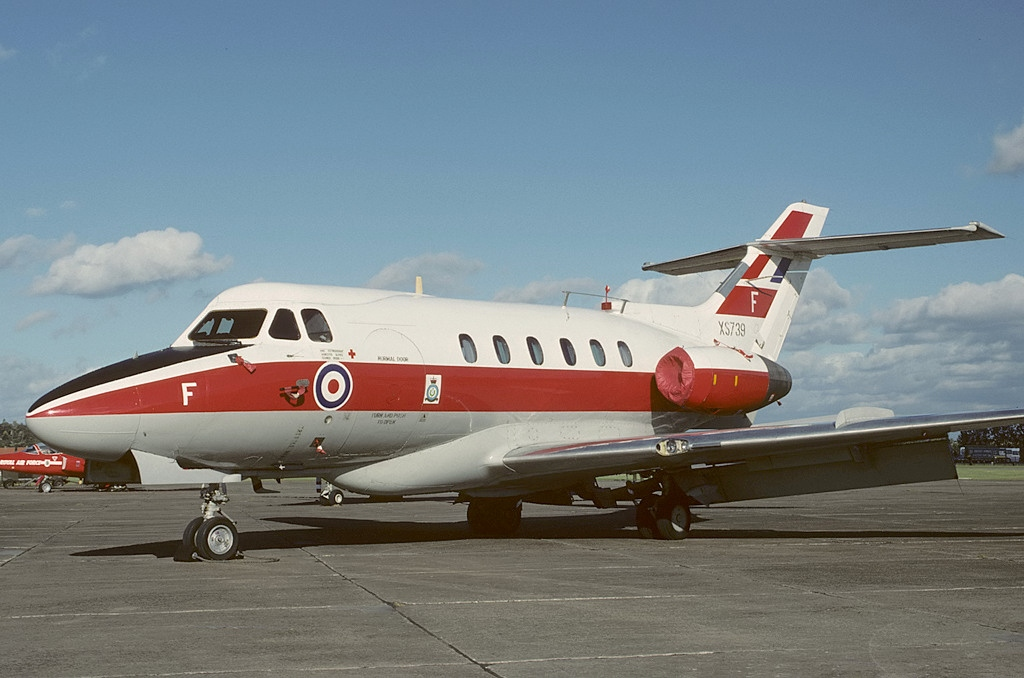
Hawker Siddeley HS-125-2 Dominie T1 XS739 of 6FTS from RAF Finningley in September 1988; the Dominie replaced the Vickers Varsity in the early 1960s

She became an officer on 27 August 1987, from that of Aircraftwoman with the WRAF.

She began training with the RAF as a navigator (on multi-engined aircraft) on Monday 18 September 1989 at RAF Finningley, when a Pilot Officer and aged 21, with Pilot Officer Sally Hawkins from Wolverhampton, aged 20, and Flying Officer Wendy Smith from Bournemouth, aged 25. They trained on the twin-engined HS 125, for many years with the RAF for training pilots and navigators on multi-engined aircraft.

On 1 March 1991, 22-year-old Flying Officer Anne-Marie Dawe qualified from No. 6 Flying Training School RAF in South Yorkshire. She had been there for eighteen months, being presented with her navigator insignia by Air Chief Marshal Brendan Jackson, becoming the first female RAF commissioned air crew. Julie Ann Gibson would be the second RAF commissioned air crew in June 1991.

She was posted to No.242 Operational Conversion Unit at RAF Lyneham, on the four-engine Hercules.

From June 2010 to July 2012 she was the Officer Commanding of 54(R) Squadron at RAF Waddington in North Kesteven, Lincolnshire; at the time, she was the only female commander of an RAF squadron. In 2011 she flew with 907 Expeditionary Air Wing.

She works with the Royal Air Force Winter Sports Association, and RAF Swimming. She was promoted from Flight Lieutenant to Squadron Leader on 1 January 2003, to Wing Commander on 1 July 2008, and to Group Captain on 9 October 2017.

During the RAF100 Celebrations in 2018, Group Captain Houghton served as the Parade Commander outside Buckingham Palace.

Houghton was appointed Officer of the Order of the British Empire (OBE) in the 2021 New Year Honours.

=== Deployment of women with the RAF ===
At first, women were to be allowed as pilots and navigators on transport aircraft, such as the Hercules, and helicopters, but not fast-jet aircraft. On 16 December 1991, it was announced that women could fly in fast-jet aircraft too.

By August 1996, there were 111 female air crew in the RAF, with 20 working as navigators, 16 instructors, and 16 female pilots. 21 were in training as aircrew. But women were restricted from many frontline roles in the British Army, such as tanks.

=== Navigators within the RAF ===
Navigators became weapon systems officers (WSO) as the electronics (avionics) onboard aircraft largely replaced the purpose of navigators, or did much of their work.

=== Involvement in the Royal Air Force Air Cadets ===
She currently serves as the Honorary President of No.1483 (Brentwood) Squadron of Essex Wing RAFAC.

Currently Group Captain Houghton is a service instructor at 155 (Maidenhead) Sqn in Thames Valley Wing Air Cadets.

== Personal life ==
She married in September 1995 in Swindon; her husband, now deceased, was a former Fleet Air Arm helicopter pilot. She lives in Essex. In December 2012, she was on the cover of Good Housekeeping.

== See also ==
- Patricia Howard
- Nikki Thomas (from Exmouth), the first female Wing Commander with the RAF, and the first female commander of a fast jet squadron (12 Squadron at RAF Marham)
