= John Grindon =

- Born: 30 September 1917; Newquay, England
- Died: 11 November 2001 (aged 84); Hampshire, England
- Military career
- Allegiance: United Kingdom
- Branch: Royal Air Force
- Service years: 1935–1959
- Rank: Group Captain
- Service number: 33206
- Commands: RAF Honington (1957–58); Queen's Flight (1953–56); No. 617 Squadron RAF (1945); No. 630 Squadron RAF (1944–45)
- Conflicts: Second World War
- Awards: Commander of the Royal Victorian Order; Distinguished Service Order; Air Force Cross

Group Captain John Evelyn Grindon, CVO, DSO, AFC (30 September 1917 – 11 November 2001) was a senior Royal Air Force officer. He served as a bomber pilot in the Second World War, and later commanded the Queen's Flight.

Grindon was the son of Thomas Edward Grindon, a First World War casualty, and Dora Eastlake. He married Miss Hubber in 1937.

A portrait is held by the National Portrait Gallery.
