= Jonathan Ferguson (pilot) =

Aviator and technician

- With a Gloster Whittle that he delivered to the Royal Aircraft Establishment
- Born: Irene Joy Ferguson; 30 October 1915; Lurgan, Ireland
- Died: 31 May 1974 (aged 58)
- Occupation: scientific civil servant

Jonathan Ferguson (30 October 1915 – 31 May 1974) was an Irish electrical technician who worked as a scientific civil servant in the Ministries of Aircraft Production and Supply. During the Second World War, he flew aircraft with the Air Transport Auxiliary. In 1958, he had sex reassignment surgery.

== Early life ==
Ferguson was born in Lurgan on 30 October 1915 to Edward and Jessie Robertson Ferguson (née Fyfe), and was first educated at Lurgan High School and College. He studied electrical engineering at technical colleges while working as a demonstrator for electricity boards in Northern Ireland and England. He then joined British Thomson-Houston to work on switchgear and, from there, became a technical assistant at the Ministry of Aircraft Production. Ferguson joined the Women's Engineering Society (WES) in 1940, joining the Council in 1947 and staying involved until the late 1950s. Ferguson represented WES on the Scholarship panel for the Amy Johnson Memorial Scholarship which was set up to support young women to further their flying careers.

== Second World War ==
Ferguson had joined the Civil Air Guard and learnt to fly with them. In May 1943, he joined the Air Transport Auxiliary and flew warplanes for the RAF as a ferry pilot until October 1945, logging about a thousand flight hours. Ferguson reached the rank of Second Officer in the ATA and, after the war, was commissioned as a Pilot Officer in the Women's RAF Volunteer Reserve.

== Personal life ==
In 1958, Ferguson announced that he had undergone sex reassignment surgery and his birth certificate had been updated so that he would henceforth be known as Jonathan Ferguson. He said "I want to get this done in as dignified a way as possible". His mother Jessie Ferguson made a statutory declaration on 7 January 1958 in support of her son. He was then a Chief Experimental Officer in the Ministry of Supply, working on aircraft research and development and the change did not affect his position.

== Later career ==
In the mid 1960s, Jonathan Ferguson was in charge of a civilian group of around twenty ex-pilots who wrote and produced Aircrew Manuals, (previously known as Pilot's Notes) in conjunction with test establishment pilots and RAF staff. He referred to his life before transitioning as "when I wore a skirt".

Jonathan Ferguson died in 1974 after falling from a domestic ladder.
