= LEC Refrigeration =

Former British white goods manufacturer now part of Glen Dimplex

Longford Engineering Company
- Company type: Private company subsidiary
- Industry: Home appliances
- Founded: 4 April 1942; 84 years ago
- Founders: Charles Reginald Purley; Frank Purley
- Headquarters: Prescot, Merseyside, United Kingdom
- Area served: United Kingdom; Canada
- Products: Fridges and freezers
- Parent: Glen Dimplex
- Website: lec.co.uk

LEC Refrigeration, known by its full title as Longford Engineering Company Refrigeration, is a British company manufacturing refrigerators and freezers.

== History ==
It was formed in 1942, by fishmongers Frank Purley and his brother Charles Reginald Purley (born 1910 in Twickenham) as Longford Engineering Company Ltd. Charles had moved to Bognor in 1929. It began making munitions for the war on Longford Road in Bognor, but began making experimental refrigerators from 1945. It made its first fridge in 1946, the year the Shripney Road site was obtained, with production beginning in 1947. Charles Purley was the company's chairman until October 1991, shortly before his death in December 1991.

The name was changed to LEC Refrigeration on 13 December 1954. Around 60% of its products were for the domestic market, with the rest for commercial use. Before 1956, it was selling more products abroad than in the United Kingdom. It was based at the Shripney Works, a fourteen-acre site at Bersted in the north of Bognor Regis in Sussex, off Shripney Road (A29) next to the Bognor Regis branch line. On the other side of the railway, it had 56 acres of land, part of which was used to build an airfield, LEC Airfield, from which the company could fly to visit overseas buyers and factories.

By 1960, only 13% of homes in the United Kingdom had a refrigerator, compared to 96% in the United States. Around that time Lec produced its Twelve Six range of fridges, costing £179 each. In 1970, the Co Op (Co-operative Wholesale Society) decided to produce its own range of freezers, manufactured by Lec, which retailed at £93. In 1973, it opened a factory in Northern Ireland. In the 1970s, its freezers were the Which? best buys.

By the beginning of the 1980s, it had around 1,600 employees, and had around 20% of the domestic refrigeration market in the United Kingdom. Its products had the Regis suffix, to denote where they were made, but by now had a northern site in Burnley, Lancashire. By the 1980s, the company was known as LEC Refrigeration plc, an LSE listed company.

In March 1993, the company laid off staff, and its workforce dropped to below 1,000, when it decided to import its compressors from Denmark instead of making them itself. From 1994, a new £35 million computerised factory was built on the neighbouring New Era industrial estate. From August 2005, production of domestic fridges was moved to Whiston at a site off the A57 near Whiston Hospital, run by Glen Dimplex Home Appliances. The Bognor site has been redeveloped into a Sainsbury's. The factory is due to be demolished in mid-2011.

=== Special product division ===
From 1956, it opened its special products division which made fridges for hospitals, aircraft and laboratories. This is now the leading manufacturer of these types of refrigerators in the United Kingdom, trading as Lec Medical and Lec Commercial. Production of specialist fridges continued at Bognor from 2005 to 2007, but production finally finished at Bognor Regis on 19 April 2007. The division is now owned by Glen Dimplex Professional Appliances.

=== Motor racing ===
LEC Refrigeration Racing was formed by the company in the 1970s out of The Bee and Cee Rally Championship of the LEC Car Club which started in the 1950's and awarded a silver cup annually. Winners included B.Orme and M.Campbell in 1960 and L.A.Humphries in 1965. one of the more famed drivers was David Purley, known for the 1973 Dutch Grand Prix, and son of the company's founder.

== Ownership ==
It became a public company on 1 September 1964. In 1988, the company had a turnover of £56 million, making a £4 million profit. Charles Purley died in December 1991. He had been appointed an OBE in the 1986 New Years Honours List.

Sime Darby

On 21 July 1994, it was bought by Sime Darby of Malaysia. The company was valued at around £21 million, making around 300,000 units a year. In the beginning of the 1990s, prior to its sale, the company had been making a £3 million loss. By 1997, it claimed to be No.2 in the United Kingdom, with a 15% share, after Hotpoint with 18%.

Glen Dimplex

On 26 February 2005, it was bought by the Irish company Glen Dimplex.

== Structure ==
Commercial operations are from the Glen Dimplex site at Whiston.

== Products ==
- Fridges
- Freezers
- Wine coolers

Some of its energy efficient products are registered for an enhanced capital allowance, which can be written off against taxable profit, as found on The Carbon Trust's Energy Technology Product List.

== See also ==
- Local enterprise company, Scottish business support regional organisation
