= Freydis Sharland =

Pioneering woman pilot

Freydis Leaf
- Born: Freydis Mary Leaf; 22 September 1920; Cambridge, Cambridgeshire, England
- Died: 24 May 2014 (aged 93); Benson, Oxfordshire, England
- Known for: Pioneering pilot

Freydis Sharland (née Leaf; 22 September 1920 – 24 May 2014) was a pioneering woman pilot and one of the first women to get RAF wings.

== Early life and education ==
Freydis Leaf was born in Cambridge to Catherine (née Kay-Shuttleworth) and Charles Leaf. She was the middle child of three: she had two brothers, Derek and Robin. Her father was a meteorologist and amateur archaeologist who served in both the First World War, as an Army officer, and the Second World War as an officer of the Royal Marines. He was an Olympic gold-medallist in sailing during the interwar period. Her maternal grandfather was Ughtred Kay-Shuttleworth of Gawthorpe Hall.

She was educated at Ancaster Gate school, Bexhill, East Sussex, then Wycombe Abbey school, Buckinghamshire.

== War-service ==
When her father and brother Derek started to learn to fly in 1937, Freydis insisted on the same opportunity: they all learned to fly at the Marshall flying school in Cambridge. When the war began, Leaf volunteered as a nurse in the Red Cross in Colchester, Essex while trying to get into the Air Transport Auxiliary (ATA) for over a year. She went on to work with the Aeronautical Inspection Directorate.

In 1942, she joined the ATA, and began her career as a pilot. Starting with 26 hours and 10 minutes flying time, she was based in Hamble, Hampshire. She also served in the Ferry Pools (FP) in Sherburn-in-Elmet in Yorkshire, Prestwick in Scotland and White Waltham, in Berkshire. As an ATA pilot, Leaf learned to fly a wide range of planes from the Vickers Wellington and the Lockheed Hudson to the De Havilland Mosquito and Spitfire. By the end of the war she had 607 hours and 25 minutes flying time accumulated. Her brother was killed in action in 1944.

== Post-war ==
The ATA was disbanded at the end of 1945 and Leaf then worked as a freelance commercial pilot, gaining her commercial licence in November 1946.

In 1953, as a commercial pilot, Leaf flew a Hawker Tempest V on a 4,000-mile flight from the base in England to a Pakistan Air Force base in Karachi. When she arrived, after stops in Nicosia, Baghdad and Bahrain she was not allowed to use the Officers mess because she was a woman.

In 1949 she was commissioned into the Women's RAF Volunteer Reserve (WRAFVR), as a Pilot Officer; she later earned a promotion to Flying Officer. During her 5-year commission, she also became one of the first women to qualify as an RAF pilot.

In 1954 Leaf became the British Air-Racing Champion and, in the following year, she founded the British Women Pilots' Association. She was also a leading figure in the Women's Junior Air Corps and the Girls Venture Corps.

== First five ==
Jean Bird, Benedetta Willis, Jackie Moggridge, Freydis Leaf and Joan Hughes were the first five women to qualify as pilots of the RAF. All qualified in the early 1950s, as officers of WRAFVR, and were awarded the standard 'Wings' of an RAF pilot. There was a gap of nearly four decades until the next woman, Julie Ann Gibson, a regular officer of the WRAF, qualified in 1991.

== Personal life ==
On the Edinburgh Castle liner to South Africa with her mother to visit her brother, Leaf met Tim Sharland, a former British Army officer. They married shortly after, on New Year's Eve and worked both in Africa and Britain. They had three children, two daughters and a son. Freydis Sharland stopped flying for several years while her children were young but took it up again when her youngest was 17. After she retired from training young women pilots with the Girl's Venture Corps she began flying microlights until the end of the 20th century.

She died 24 May 2014 in Benson, Oxfordshire age 93.

== Commemoration ==
On 18 May 2024, a blue plaque was revealed at her former home in Benson, Oxfordshire, unveiled by her children Angie and Charlie.

== Sources ==
- Fountain, Nigel (10 June 2014). "Freydis Sharland obituary". The Guardian.
- "First Officer Freydis Sharland: Veteran of wartime Air Transport". The Independent. 24 July 2014.* Mary Ellis, A.T.T.M.F. (2016). A Spitfire Girl: One of the World's Greatest Female ATA Ferry Pilots Tells Her Story. Pen & Sword Books Limited. ISBN 978-1-4738-9538-6.
- "Sharland, Freydis Mary (Oral history)". Imperial War Museums.
- "BWPA pays tribute to Freydis Sharland who died at the age of 94 on 24 May". British Women Pilots' Association. 22 June 2014.
- "Freydis Sharland". The Times. 6 June 2014.
- Schrader, H.P. (2006). Sisters in Arms: The Women Who Flew in World War II. Casemate Publishers. ISBN 978-1-84415-388-6.
- Freydis Sharland at IMDb
