= LEC Airfield =

Airport in the United Kingdom

LEC Airfield LEC Airfield
- IATA: none; ICAO: EGKC

Summary
- Airport type: Public
- Owner: BR Aviation Limited
- Location: Railside Retail Park, Shripney Road, Bognor Regis, West Sussex, PO22 9FL, United Kingdom
- Elevation AMSL: 5 ft / 2 m
- Coordinates: 50.801°N 0.6595°W
- Website: https://www.brgc.co.uk/

Map
- Location in West Sussex

Runways
Direction	Length		Surface
Direction	m	ft	Surface
05/23	610	2,001	Tarmac
- Sources: Bognor Regis Gliding Club

LEC Airfield (ICAO: EGKC), also known as Bognor Regis Airfield, is an active airfield in Bognor Regis, United Kingdom. It is operated by the Bognor Regis Gliding Club.

It was formerly owned by the LEC Refrigeration company, and was located behind their factory. Flying may have begun here from a grass strip in 1943. From 1947 the company used Auster and Miles Gemini aircraft to visit its overseas buyers. In the 1970s the company used Cessna aircraft to visit their factories in Londonderry and Calais. A hard tarmac runway was created in 1984. British racing driver and aerobatic pilot David Purley's Pitts Special was also hangared there, in which Purley died while practicing aerobatics in 1985.

LEC Refrigeration was sold to Sime Darby in 1994. In 2016 Sime Darby sold the 45-acre airfield to a local glider pilot and businessman, Julian Hitchcock, through his company BR Aviation Limited. The Bognor Regis Gliding Club was consequently established at the airfield, with operations officially commencing in October 2016. The runway is paved for 610m, but a grass extension brings the total length up to 850m.

LEC Airfield is not to be confused with RAF Bognor, which was located several miles away.

== Bognor Regis Gliding Club ==
Since 2016 the airfield has been home to the Bognor Regis Gliding Club (BRGC). The club conducts aero-tow, winch, and motorised self-launches. The club’s fleet has included a DG Flugzeugbau DG1001M two-seat self-launching glider, a Grob 109b TMG, a EuroFox 915 iS for aerotow and two Schleicher K21 training gliders for dual instruction. With a mix of professional and volunteer instructors, BRGC provides training and trial flights year-round on LEC Airfield’s 610 m tarmac runway and adjacent grass extension. The club operates as a members’ organization open to novices and experienced pilots alike, and it conducts regular training sorties as well as outreach events such as open days to grow local participation in gliding.
