= Lennox Godfrey Bird =

Lennox Godfrey Bird (1878–1956) was a British architect who was a prominent practitioner in Hong Kong. He was partner in Palmer and Turner (now P & T Architects & Engineers Ltd.) from 1907 to 1935.

Bird was director of the Shek O Development Company (石澳道業主委員會), and was responsible for the design of many older bungalows in the vicinity of Shek O. He also held positions of commandant of the Hong Kong Volunteer Defence Corps, president of the local chapter of the Royal Society of St. George and president of the Hong Kong Hockey Club.

His daughter, Jean Bird, was the first woman to be awarded RAF wings.
