= No. 617 Squadron RAF =

Flying squadron of the Royal Air Force

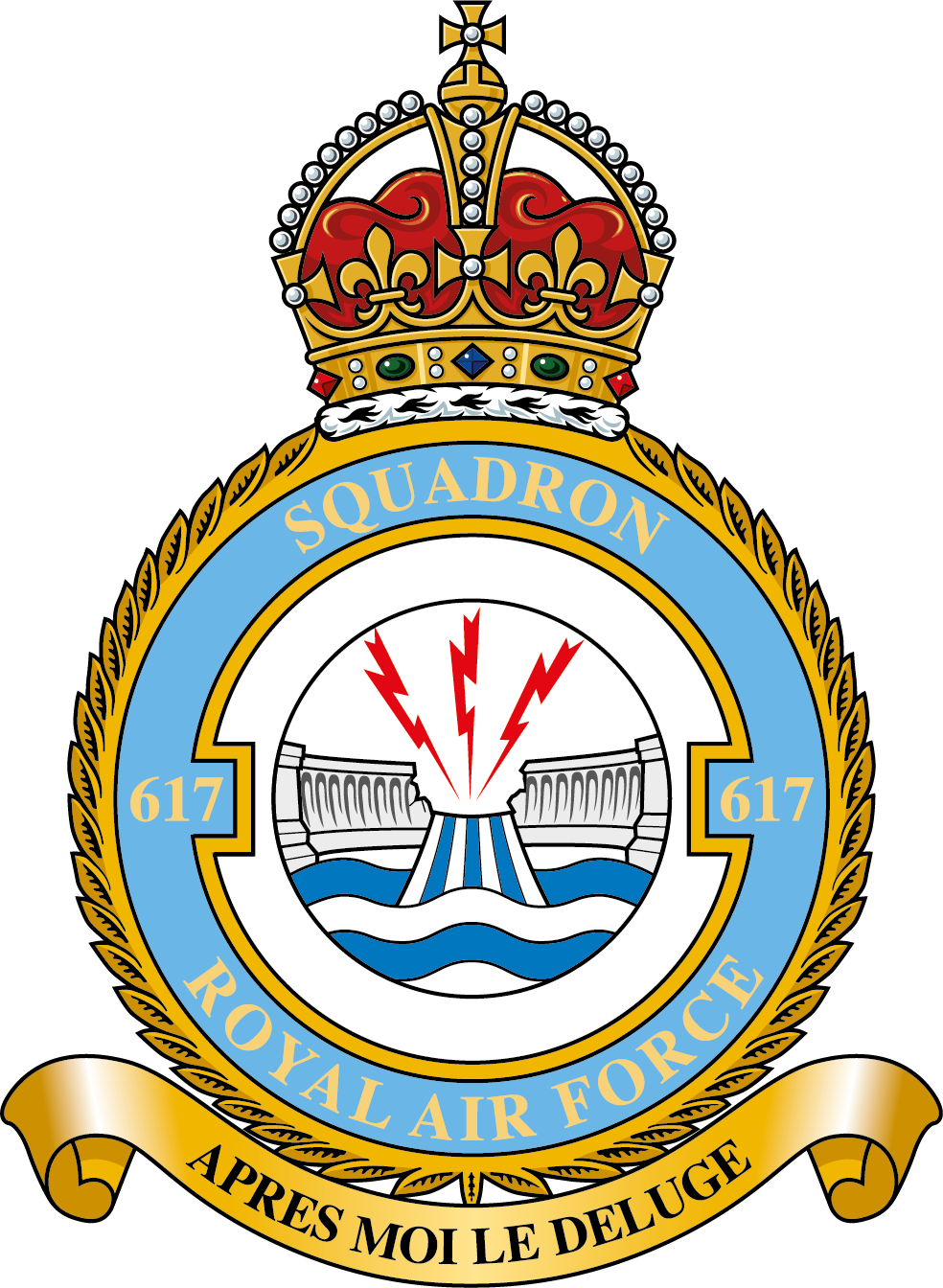
- Squadron badge
- Active: 21 March 1943 – 15 December 1955; 1 May 1958 – 31 December 1981; 1 January 1983 – 28 March 2014; 18 April 2018 – present
- Country: United Kingdom
- Branch: Royal Air Force
- Type: Flying squadron
- Role: Multi–role combat
- Part of: No. 1 Group
- Home station: RAF Marham
- Nickname: 'The Dambusters'
- Mottos: Après moi le déluge (French for 'After me, the flood')
- Aircraft: Lockheed Martin F-35B Lightning

Commanders
- Notable commanders: Guy Gibson; Leonard Cheshire; Willie Tait; John Fauquier

Insignia
- Squadron badge heraldry: On a roundel, a dam in fesse, fractured by three flashes of lightning in pile and issuant from the breach water proper. The broken dam is indicative of the successful attack on the dams in May 1943. Approved by King George VI in March 1944.
- Squadron roundel
- Squadron codes: MZ (1939) (never used); AJ (1943–1946); KC (1943–1952) (used alongside AJ); YZ (1945) (only used on aircraft used to carry 'Grand Slam' bombs); AJ-A to AJ-Z (1983–2014)

Aircraft flown
- Attack: Panavia Tornado
- Bomber: Avro Lancaster; de Havilland Mosquito; Avro Lincoln; English Electric Canberra; Avro Vulcan
- Fighter: Lockheed Martin F-35B Lightning II

No. 617 Squadron is a Royal Air Force aircraft squadron commonly known as The Dambusters for its actions during Operation Chastise against German dams during the Second World War, originally based at RAF Scampton in Lincolnshire and currently based at RAF Marham in Norfolk. In the early 21st century it operated the Panavia Tornado GR4 in the ground attack and reconnaissance role until being disbanded on 28 March 2014. The Dambusters reformed on 18 April 2018, and was equipped at RAF Marham in June 2018 with the Lockheed Martin F-35B Lightning, becoming the first squadron to be based in the UK with this advanced STOVL type. The unit is composed of both RAF and Royal Navy personnel, and operates from the Royal Navy's Queen Elizabeth-class aircraft carriers.

== History ==
=== Between the wars ===
According to the squadron's entry in Flying Units of the RAF by Alan Lake, No. 617 Squadron was allocated the unit identification code MZ for the period April to September 1939, even though the unit did not actually exist at the time.

=== Second World War ===
The squadron was formed on 21 March 1943 at RAF Scampton on Avro Lancaster heavy bombers.

It was formed under great secrecy for the specific task of attacking three major dams that contributed water and power to the Ruhr industrial region in the German Reich: the Möhne, Eder, and Sorpe. The plan was given the codename Operation Chastise and carried out on 17 May 1943. The squadron had to develop the tactics to deploy Barnes Wallis's "Bouncing bomb", and undertook some of its training over the dams of the Upper Derwent Valley in Derbyshire, as the towers on the dam walls were similar to those to be found on some of the target dams in the German Reich.

The squadron's badge, approved by King George VI, depicts the bursting of a dam in commemoration of Chastise. The squadron's chosen motto was Après moi le déluge (French for 'After me, the flood'), a humorous double entendre on a famous saying of Madame de Pompadour to King Louis XV, made on the loss at the Battle of Rossbach by the French. The original commander of No. 617 Squadron, Wing Commander Guy Gibson, was awarded the Victoria Cross for his part in the raid.

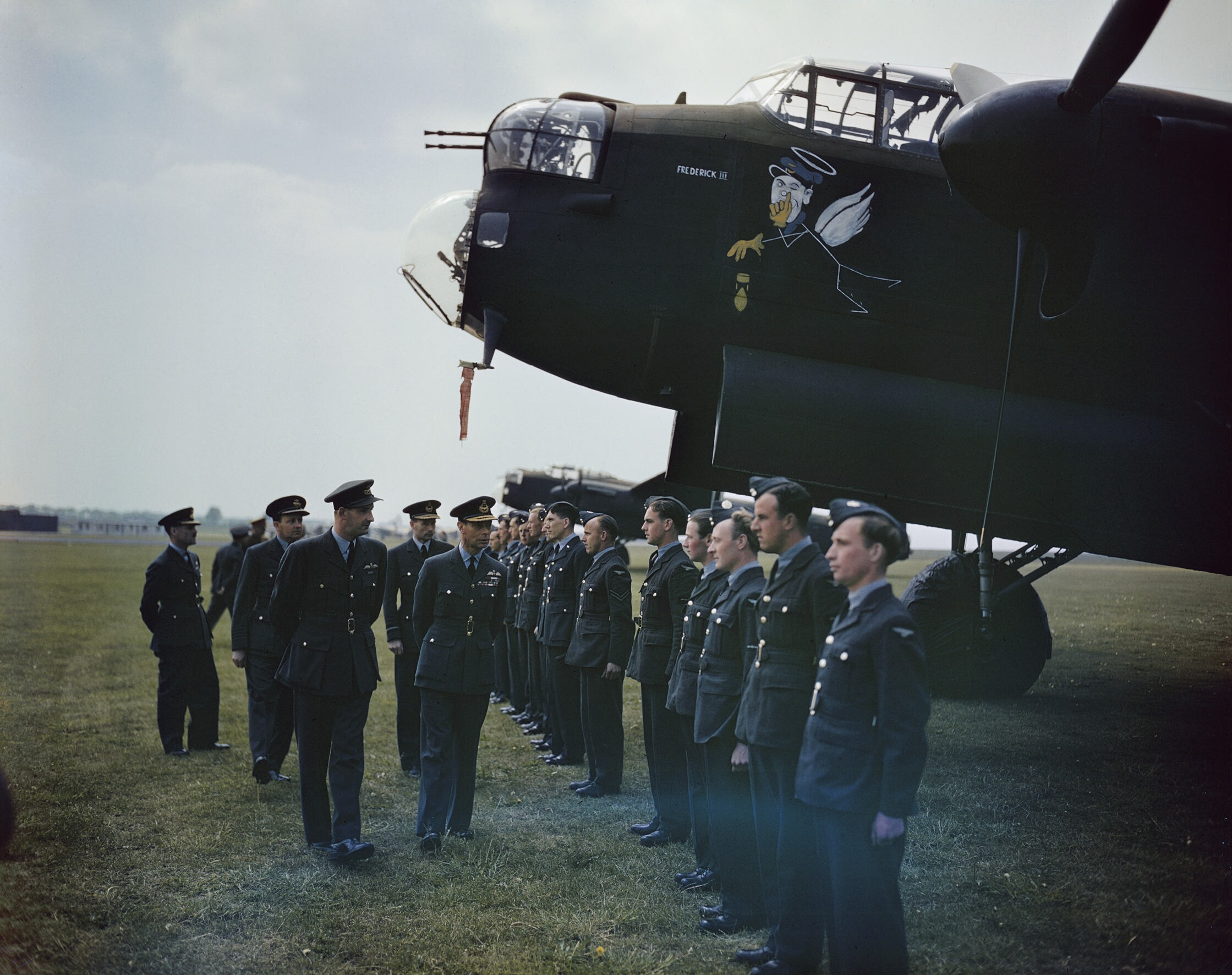
King George VI visiting No. 617 Squadron in 1943

After the raid, Gibson was withdrawn from flying (due to the high number of raids he had been on) and went on a publicity tour. Wing Commander George Holden became commanding officer (CO) in July, but he was shot down and killed on his fourth mission, Operation Garlic in September 1943, in an attack on the Dortmund-Ems Canal; he had four of Gibson's crew with him. H. B. "Mick" Martin took command temporarily, before Leonard Cheshire took over as CO. Cheshire developed and personally took part in the special target marking techniques required, which went far beyond the precision delivered by the standard Pathfinder units – by the end he was marking the targets from a Mustang fighter. He was also awarded the VC.

On 15 July 1943, 12 aircraft of the squadron took off from Scampton to attack targets in Northern Italy. All aircraft attacked and proceeded to North Africa without loss. The targets were San Polo d'Enza and Arquata Scrivia power stations; it was hoped that the attacks would delay German troops who were travelling down into Italy on the electrified railway system to support the Italian front. The operation met little opposition but the targets were obscured by valley haze and were not destroyed. The 12 crews returned to Scampton on 25 July from North Africa after bombing Leghorn docks on the return journey. The raid on Leghorn Docks was not a great success, due to mist shrouding the target. On 29 July 1943 nine aircraft took off from Scampton to drop leaflets on Milan, Bologna, Genoa and Turin in Italy. All aircraft completed the mission and landed safely in Blida, North Africa.

The UK Government considered using No. 617 Squadron to target the Italian leader Mussolini in July or August 1943. The British believed if Mussolini was killed it might take Italy out of the war. It would have been a flight carried out at extremely low level with the targets of Mussolini's headquarters and residence in Rome. Neither of these targets were within 1,500 yards of the Vatican, which the Allies had promised not to damage. However within two weeks of the plan being suggested, Mussolini was ousted by his opponents and replaced by Pietro Badoglio, leading to an armistice with the Allies in September.

Throughout the rest of the war, the squadron continued in a specialist and precision-bombing role, including the use of the enormous "Tallboy" and "Grand Slam" ground-penetrating earthquake bombs, on targets such as concrete U-boat shelters and bridges. Several failed attempts were made on the two Glane culverts in the old and new canal branches of the Dortmund-Ems Canal west of Ladbergen in the German Reich. The Operation Garlic carried out on 14-16 September 1943 was unsuccessful as the canal was not significantly damaged by the attack, while 617 Squadron lost six of the nine aircraft and crews involved in the operation. The canal was eventually breached the following year. On the night of the 23/24 September 1944 aircraft of 617 Squadron attacked the canal using the Tallboy bombs that breached the canal embankments. Further attacks followed. During the attack on 4/5 November 1944, the culvert in the Alte Fahrt (i.e. the old branch) was destroyed and not repaired. After every successful attack, shipping had to be suspended and the canal repaired by the Ladbergen Canal Authority. It was not until the attack on 3/4 March 1945 that the canal became unnavigable for the remainder of the war.

In March 1945 the squadron used the Grand Slam bomb for the first time, against the Bielefeld viaduct, wrecking it. The viaduct had withstood 54 previous attacks without being permanently neutralized.

The Squadron's skills in precision flying were also used in the Normandy invasion, as part of an effort to deceive the Germans as to the location of the Allied invasion. Beginning on the night before the D-day landings, the Squadron dropped thin strips of aluminium foil (called Window) over the waters off Cap d'Antifer, about 80 km (50 mi) from the D-Day landings. The strips were dropped in vast numbers, in carefully choreographed patterns, over many hours, to create on German radar an illusion of a huge approaching naval fleet, even though the ships were non-existent. The Squadron practised the technique at Tantallon Castle in Scotland, using captured German Würzburg, Freya, and Seetakt radars.

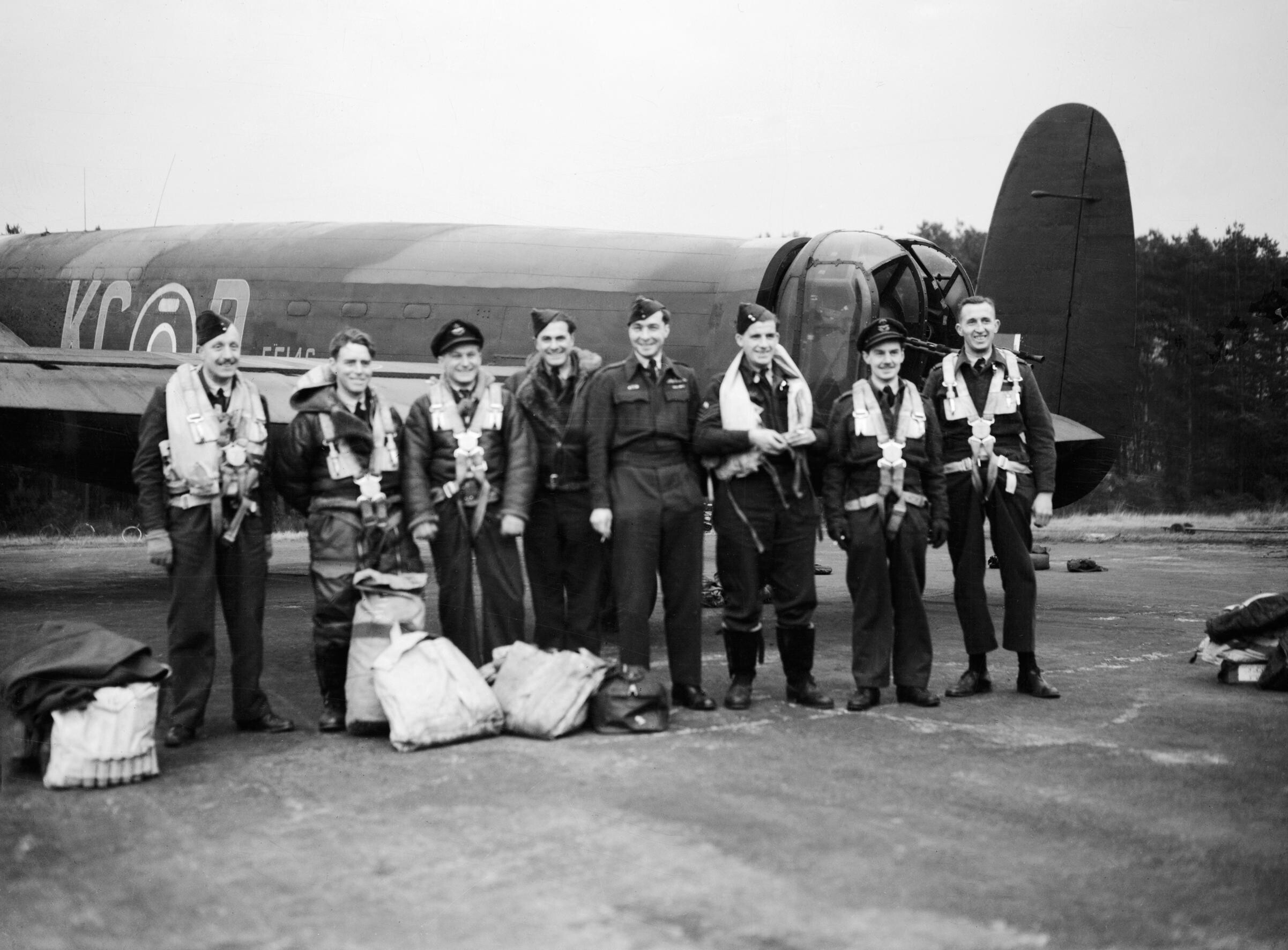
No. 617 Squadron Avro Lancaster B.I EE146 at RAF Woodhall Spa with its crew (including OC Wg. Cdr. J. B. Tait) the day after the successful attack against Tirpitz

A series of attacks caused the disabling and sinking of Tirpitz, a major German battleship that had been moved into a fjord in northern Norway where she threatened the Arctic convoys and was too far north to be attacked by air from the UK. She had already been damaged by an attack by Royal Navy midget submarines and a series of attacks from carrier-borne aircraft of the Fleet Air Arm, but both attacks had failed to sink her. The task was given to No. IX and No. 617 Squadrons; they were deployed to Yagodnik, near Archangel a staging base in Russia to attack Tirpitz with Tallboy bombs. On 15 September 1944, the RAF bombers struck the battleship in the forecastle, which rendered her unseaworthy, so she was sent to the Tromsø fjord where temporary repairs were made so she was anchored as a floating battery. This fjord was in range of bombers operating from Scotland and from there, in October, she was attacked again, but cloud cover thwarted the attack. Finally on 12 November 1944, the two squadrons attacked Tirpitz. The first bombs missed their target, but following aircraft scored two direct hits in quick succession. Within ten minutes of the first bomb hitting the Tirpitz, she suffered a magazine explosion at her "C" turret and capsized killing 1,000 of her 1,700 crew. All three RAF attacks on Tirpitz were led by Wing Commander J. B. "Willy" Tait, who had succeeded Cheshire as CO of No. 617 Squadron in July 1944. Among pilots participating in the raids was Flight Lieutenant John Leavitt, an American who piloted one of the 31 Lancasters. Leavitt's aircraft dropped one of the bombs that hit Tirpitz dead centre. Despite both squadrons claiming that it was their bombs that sank the Tirpitz, it was the Tallboy bomb, dropped from a No. IX Squadron Lancaster WS-Y (LM220) piloted by Flying Officer Dougie Tweddle that is attributed to the sinking of the warship. F/O Tweddle was awarded the Distinguished Flying Cross for his part in the operations against Tirpitz.

During the Second World War the Squadron carried out 1,599 operational sorties with the loss of 32 aircraft.

=== Cold War (1946–1981) ===
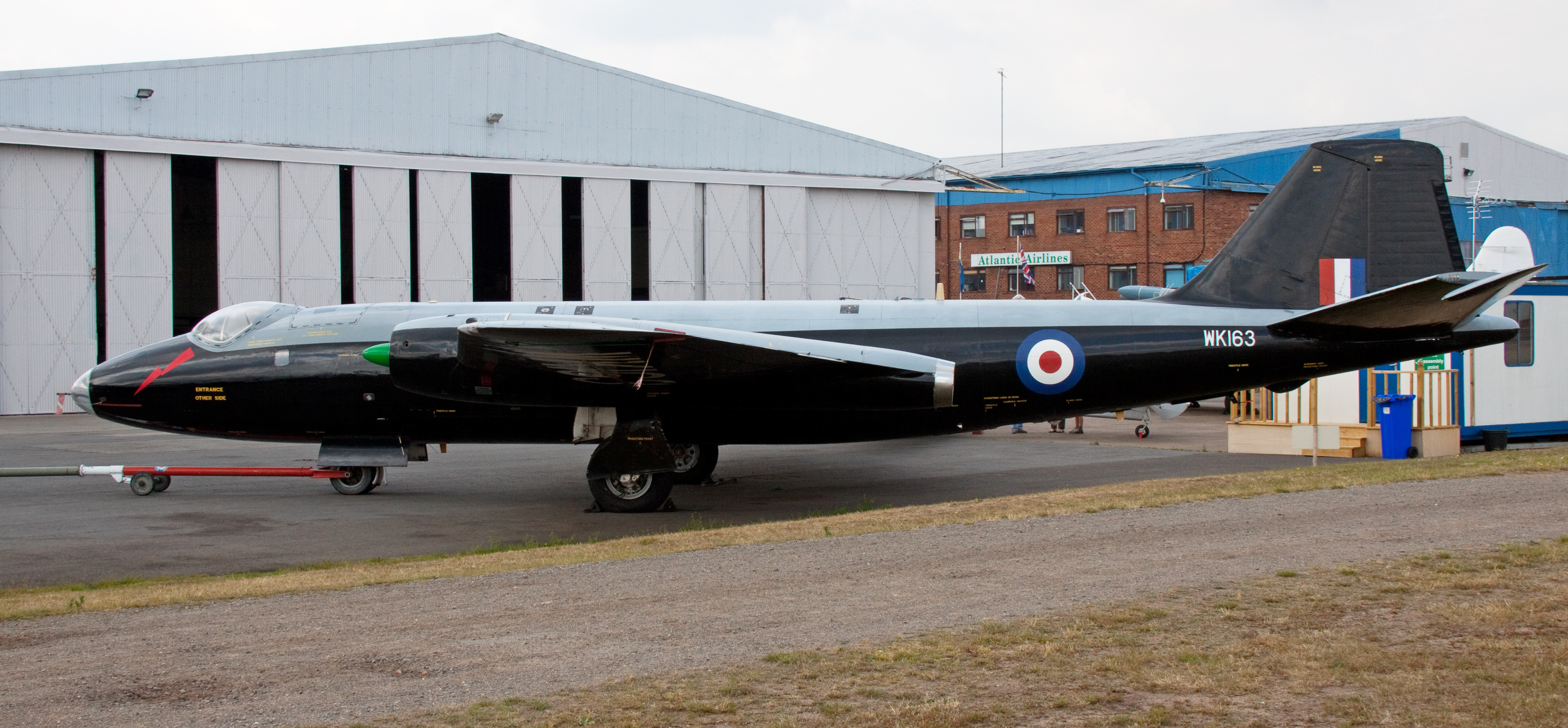
No. 617 Squadron Canberra B2 WK163 at Coventry Airport

After the end of the Second World War, the squadron replaced its Lancasters with Avro Lincolns, following those in 1952 with the English Electric Canberra jet bomber. The squadron was deployed to Malaya for four months in 1955, returning to RAF Binbrook to be disbanded on 15 December 1955. Reformed at RAF Scampton on 1 May 1958 as part of RAF Bomber Command's V-bomber force maintaining the UK's strategic nuclear deterrent, the squadron was equipped with the Avro Vulcan B1 from August 1960. By 23 May 1961, its aircraft were the upgraded Vulcan B1A fitted with the electronic countermeasures tail pod. The squadron's assigned role was high-level strategic bombing with a variety of free fall nuclear bombs. These may have included Blue Danube, Red Beard, Violet Club the Interim Megaton Weapon, Yellow Sun Mk.1 and certainly Yellow Sun Mk2. American bombs were also supplied to the RAF V-bombers for a short period under the Project E arrangements.

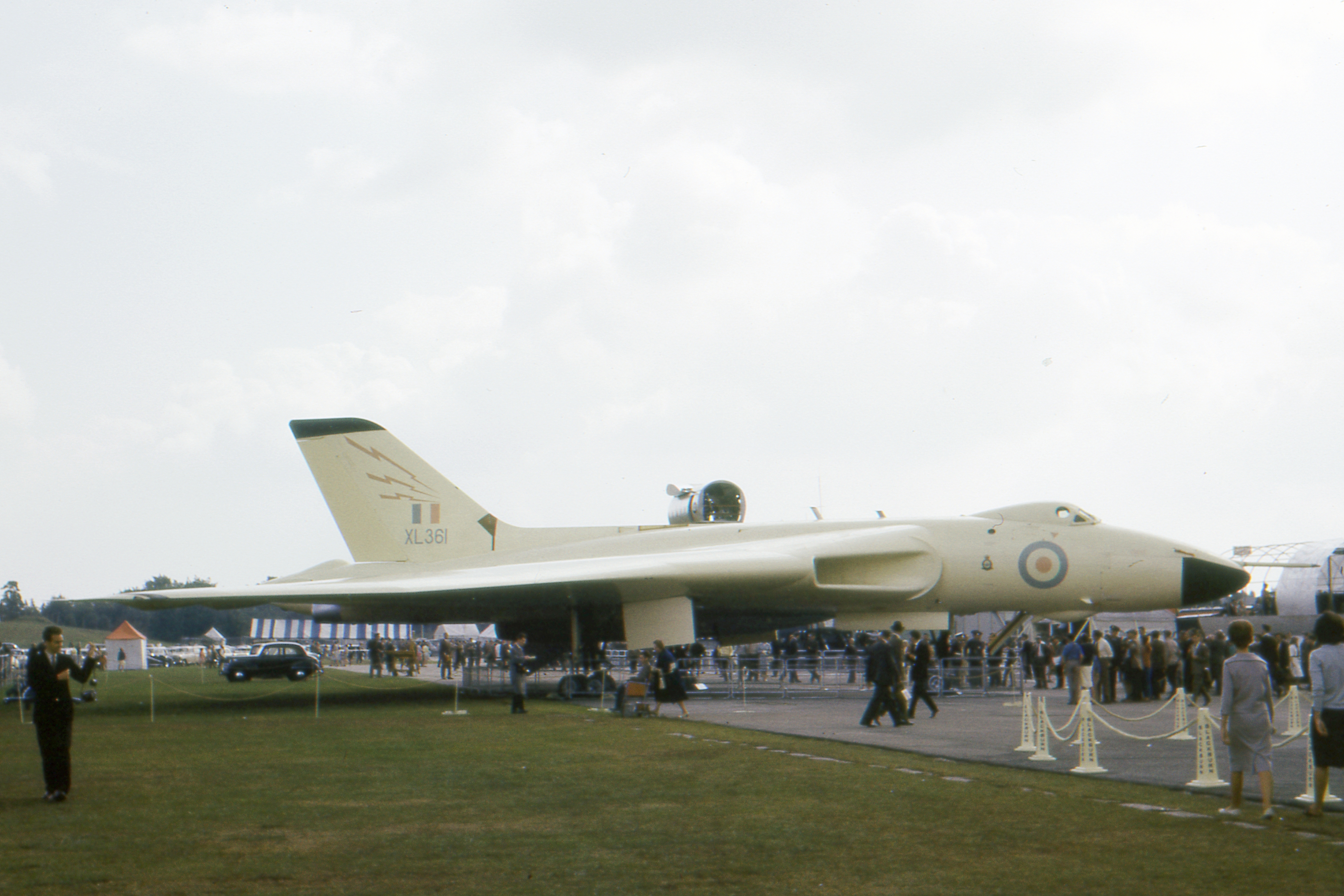
No. 617 Squadron Vulcan B2 XL361 at the Farnborough Airshow, 1962

The squadron began almost immediately to upgrade to the Vulcan B2, taking delivery of the first on 1 September 1961, although its high-level strategic bombing role remained unchanged until the advent of effective Soviet Surface-to-Air Missiles forced Bomber Command to reassign V-bombers from high-altitude operations to low-level penetration operations in March 1963, when the squadron's Vulcans adopted a mission profile that included a 'pop-up' manoeuvre from 500–1,000 ft (150–300 m) to above 12,000 ft (3,700 m) for safe release of Blue Steel.

Vulcans were configured for the Blue Steel stand-off bomb and 617 Squadron was the first to be declared operational with it in August 1962, until in January 1970 the squadron's eight Vulcan B2 aircraft were re-equipped with the new strategic laydown bomb, WE.177B which improved aircraft survivability by enabling aircraft to remain at low level during weapon release.

Following the transfer of responsibility for the nuclear deterrent to the Royal Navy, the squadron was reassigned to SACEUR for tactical strike missions. In a high-intensity European war the squadron's role was to support land forces on the Continent by striking deep into enemy-held areas beyond the forward edge of the battlefield, striking at enemy concentrations and infrastructure, with WE.177 tactical nuclear weapons, should a conflict escalate to that stage. The squadron's eight aircraft were allocated eight WE.177 nuclear bombs. As the Vulcan's bomb bay was configured to carry only one, and assuming that RAF staff planners had factored in their usual allowance for attrition in the early conventional phase of a continental war, leaving sufficient surviving aircraft to deliver the full stockpile of nuclear weapons, it is a reasonable conclusion that the Vulcan force was held in reserve for nuclear strike duties only. The squadron's Vulcan B2s served mainly in that low-level penetration role until disbandment on 31 December 1981.

=== Tornado GR (1983–2014) ===
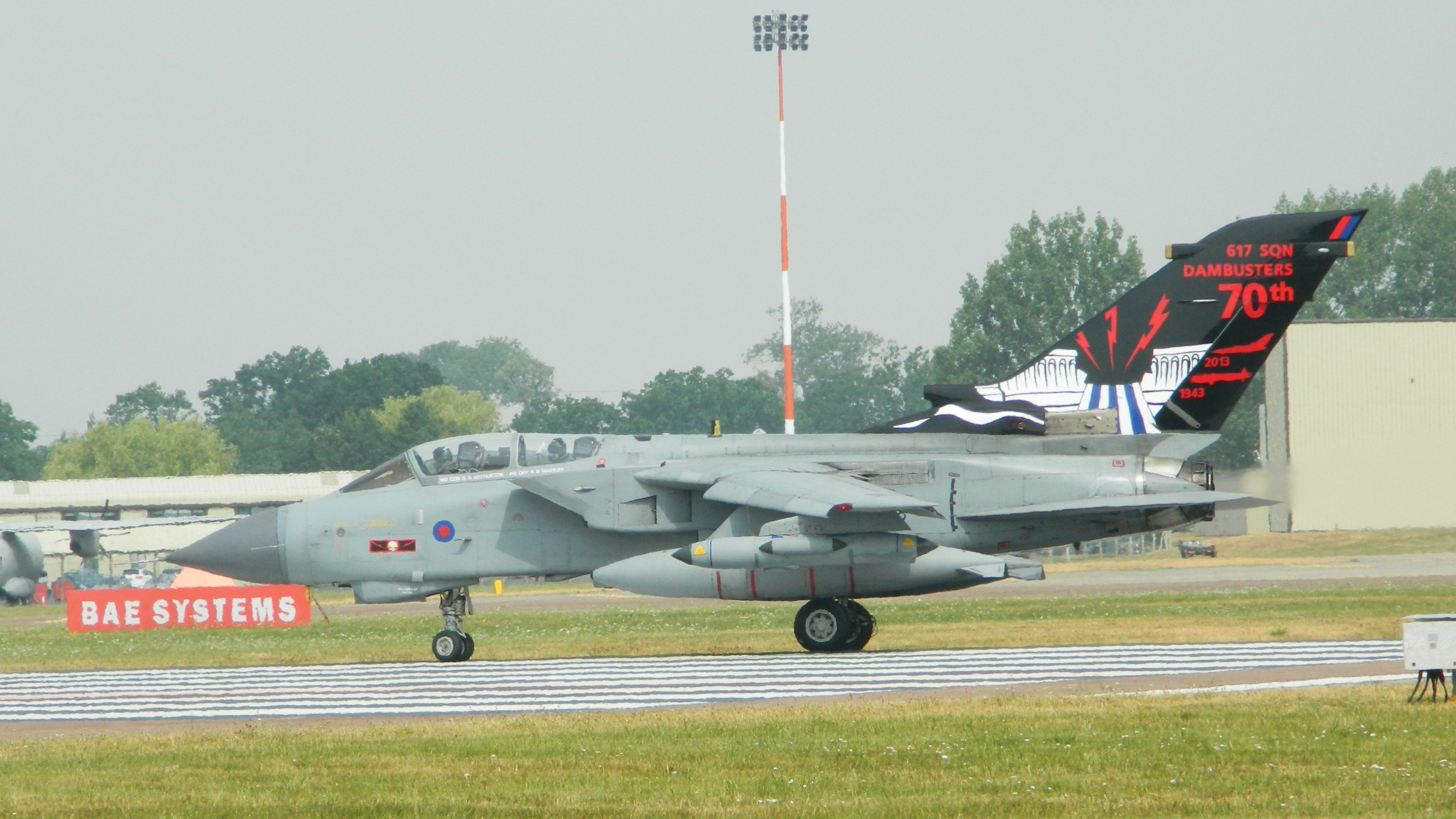
Tornado GR4 ZA412 in special markings for the 70th Anniversary of the Dams raid at RIAT, July 2013

The squadron reformed on 1 January 1983 at RAF Marham, re-equipped with twelve Panavia Tornado GR1.

No. 617 Squadron was deployed to King Faisal Air Base, Saudi Arabia following the 1990 Iraqi Invasion of Kuwait, it returned to the UK in November 1990 and replaced by 16/20 Sqn.

In 1993, No. 617 Squadron began the changeover to anti-shipping and by May 1994 was operating from RAF Lossiemouth assigned to SACLANT, flying the Tornado GR1B with the Sea Eagle missile. In December 1994, Flight Lieutenant Jo Salter became the first female combat-ready fast jet pilot.

In 1995, crews from No. 617 Squadron deployed in support of Operation Warden.

In 2003, the Squadron sent several aircraft to the Ali Al Salem Air Base, Kuwait and Al Udeid Air Base, Qatar, as part of Operation Telic joining airframes from II Squadron, IX Squadron, XIII Squadron, 31 Squadron and 12 Squadron (a total of 30 Tornado GR4/GR4A's were deployed) where they were the first squadron to use the new MBDA Storm Shadow.

In July 2009, the Dambusters deployed to Kandahar Airfield, Afghanistan, as part of Operation Herrick in order to provide support for No. 12 (Bomber) Squadron. No. 617 Squadron underwent their first full Op HERRICK deployment between April and July 2011, handing over responsibility to No. 31 Squadron on 15 July. While deployed, the Dambusters were the RAF squadron who helped the Tornado GR fleet surpass 1,000,000 flying hours in June 2011.

In July 2011, the squadron took part in Operation Ellamy

In July 2013, it was announced that No. 617 Squadron would become the first operational RAF unit to receive the Lockheed Martin F-35B Lightning. No. 617 Squadron disbanded on 28 March 2014 as part of the draw-down of the Tornado force.

=== F-35B Lightning (2017–present) ===
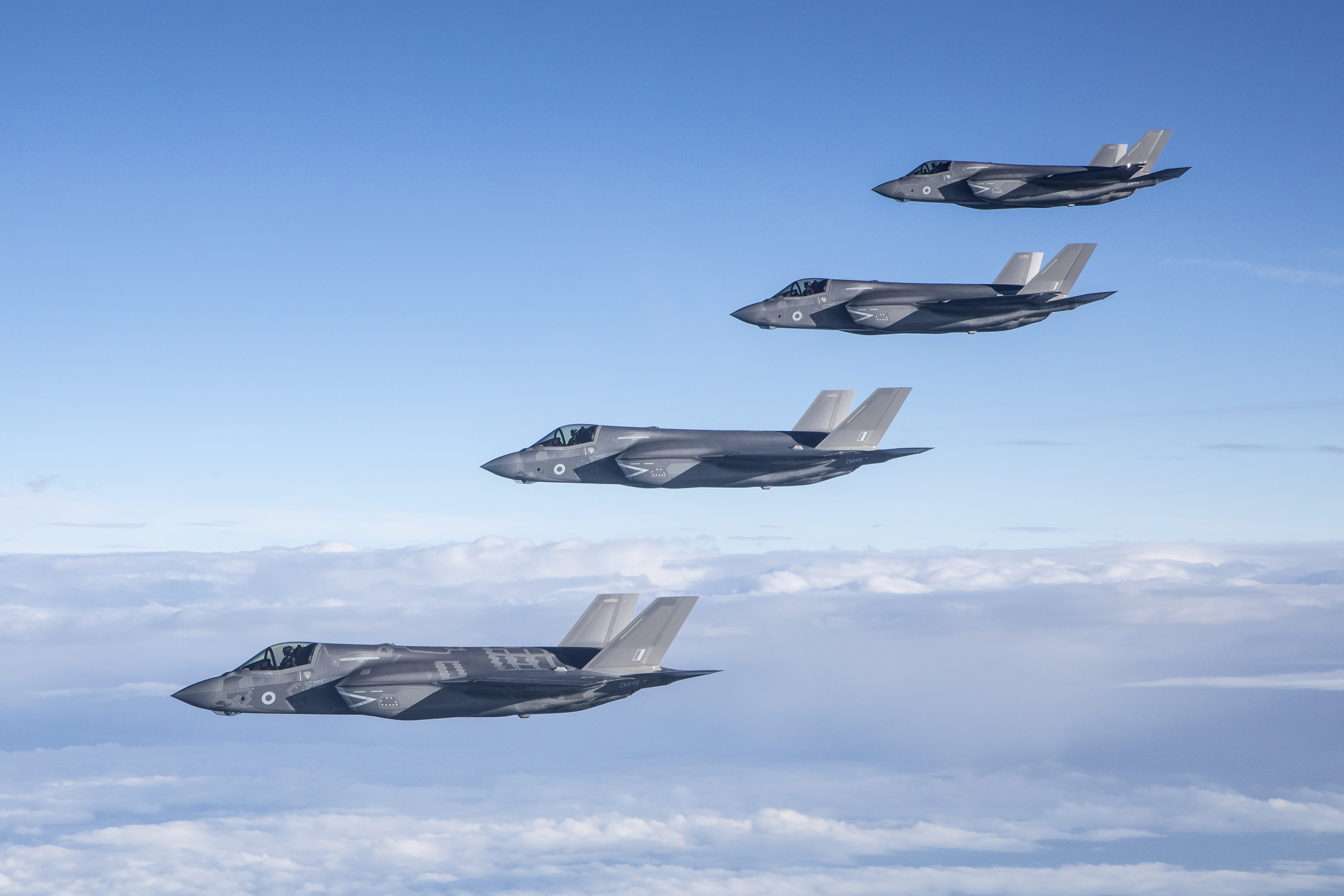
The first four F-35B Lightnings of No. 617 Squadron on their delivery flight to the UK

Beginning in 2016, the Dambusters started their training for conversion to the F-35B ahead of reforming as the first British front line squadron with the Lightning. The squadron worked up at Marine Corps Air Station Beaufort, South Carolina, in late 2017 and early 2018 before reforming on 18 April 2018.

On 6 June 2018, four No. 617 Squadron Lightnings (ZM145, ZM146, ZM147 and ZM148), supported by three Airbus Voyagers and an Airbus Atlas C1, made an eight-hour flight across the Atlantic to become the first of the UK's aircraft to be based permanently at RAF Marham. On 10 July, the squadron participated in the RAF100 flypast over London with three F-35Bs. On 3 August, five more F-35Bs arrived at RAF Marham for the Dambusters. No. 617 Squadron was declared 'combat ready' on 10 January 2019.

The Dambusters underwent their first F-35 deployment on 22 May 2019 when six Lightnings deployed to RAF Akrotiri, Cyprus, for six weeks as part of Exercise Lightning Dawn. On 16 June, No. 617 Squadron carried out the first RAF F-35 operational mission when two Lightnings conducted a patrol over Syria as part of Operation Shader. On 25 June, No. 617 Squadron's F-35Bs participated in 'Exercise Tri Lightning' alongside United States Air Force F-35As of the 4th Fighter Squadron and Israeli Air Force F-35Is of 140 Squadron over the eastern Mediterranean Sea. Four F-35B Lightnings returned home to RAF Marham on 2 July, while the other two arrived at Amendola Air Base to carry out bilateral training with the Italian Air Force, including the local F-35As of 32º Stormo. Three Lightnings departed RAF Marham on 9 October to MCAS Beaufort in preparation for Westlant 19, embarking upon HMS Queen Elizabeth for the first time alongside No. 17 Test and Evaluation Squadron on 13 October.

On 22 January 2020, the Dambusters departed Marham for Exercise Red Flag at Nellis Air Force Base, Nevada, their first with the Lightning. Between September and November 2020, the Dambusters hosted United States Marine Corps F-35Bs from VMFA-211 who deployed to RAF Marham to work up on HMS Queen Elizabeth ahead of the carrier's deployment in 2021.

In May 2021, No. 617 Squadron embarked eight F-35B Lightnings on board HMS Queen Elizabeth as part of Carrier Strike Group 2021 (CSG21), operating alongside VMFA-211 as the fixed wing component. On 16 November 2021, one of the squadron's F-35B fighters crashed during operations in the Mediterranean. The pilot ejected safely.

In late February 2026, six F-35B aircraft from No. 617 Squadron deployed from Marham to Akrotiri due to increasing tensions in the region. Shortly after the outbreak of the 2026 Iran war, one of these F-35Bs shot down two Iranian unmanned aerial vehicles while operating over Jordan in company with two Eurofighter Typhoons and a Voyager; this is the first combat shoot-down for a British F-35 and was achieved with two ASRAAM missiles.

== Aircraft operated ==
List of aircraft operated by No. 617 Squadron:

- Avro Lancaster B.III (Special) (March 1943 – May 1943)
- Avro Lancaster B.I (March 1943 – June 1945)
- Avro Lancaster B.III (March 1943 – June 1945)
- Avro Lancaster B.VII (FE) (June 1945 – September 1946)
- de Havilland Mosquito Mk.VI (April 1944 – March 1945)
- North American P-51 Mustang Mk. III (June 1944 - 1945)
- Avro Lincoln B.II (September 1946 – January 1952)
- English Electric Canberra B.2 (January 1952 – April 1955)
- English Electric Canberra B.6 (February 1955 – December 1955)
- Avro Vulcan B.1 (May 1958 – July 1961)
- Avro Vulcan B.1A (October 1960 – July 1961)
- Avro Vulcan B.2 (September 1961 – December 1981)
- Panavia Tornado GR1 (January 1983 – April 1994)
- Panavia Tornado GR1B (April 1994 – 2002)
- Panavia Tornado GR4 (2002 – January 2014)
- Lockheed Martin F-35B Lightning (December 2017 – present)
Aircraft operated by No. 617 Squadron
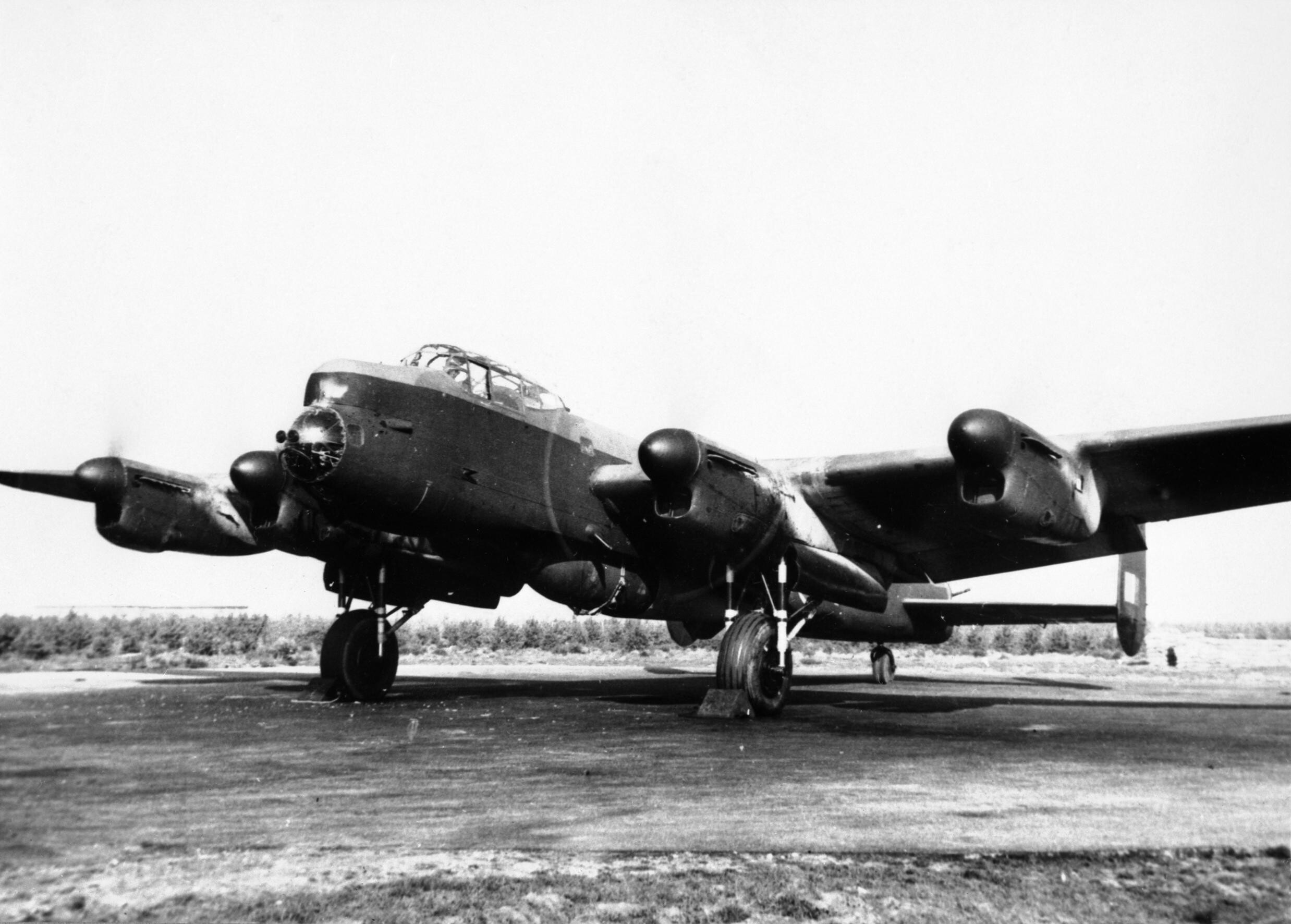
Avro Lancaster B.I (Special) of No. 617 Squadron, loaded with a 'Grand Slam' 22,000lb deep-penetration bomb, running up its engines at RAF Woodhall Spa, Lincolnshire, during 1944.

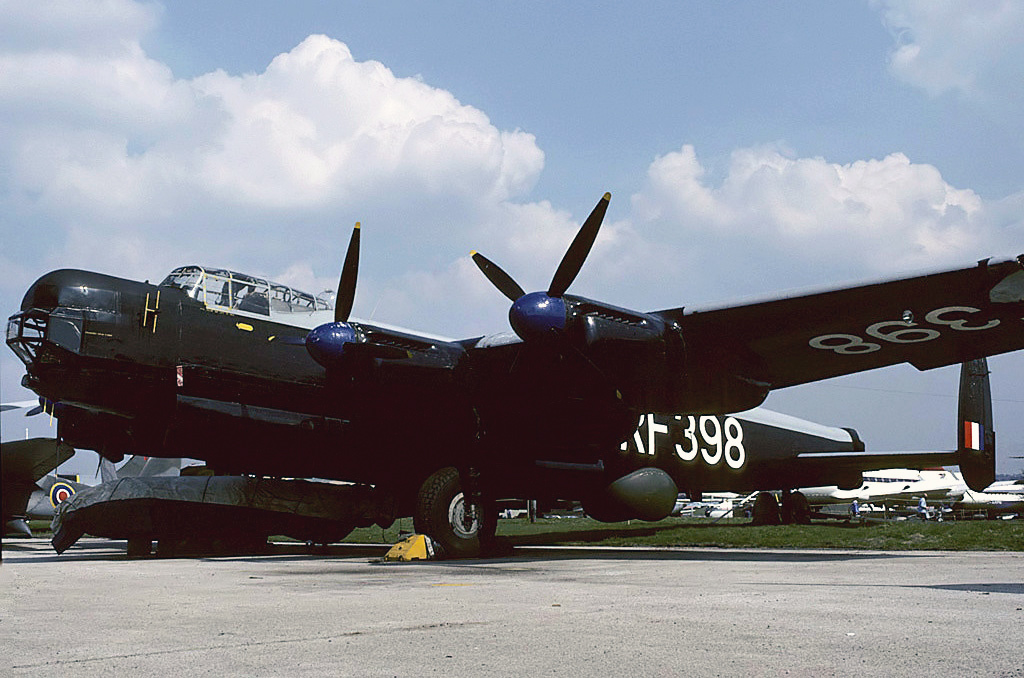
An Avro Lincoln B.2

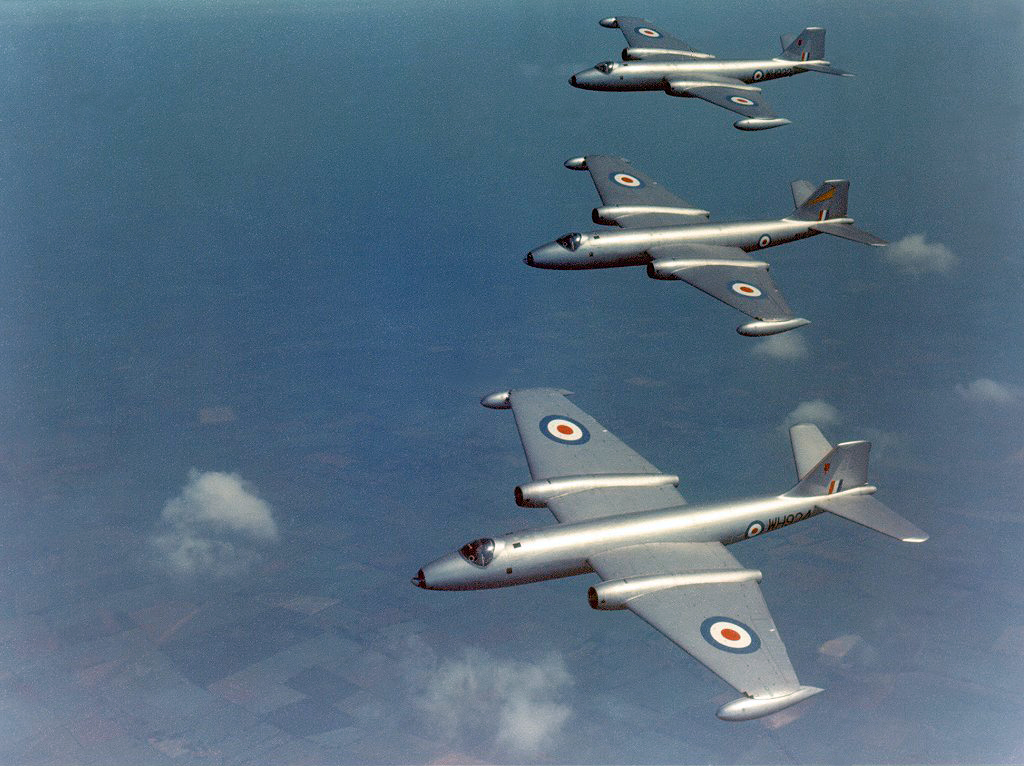
Three English Electric Canberra B.2s

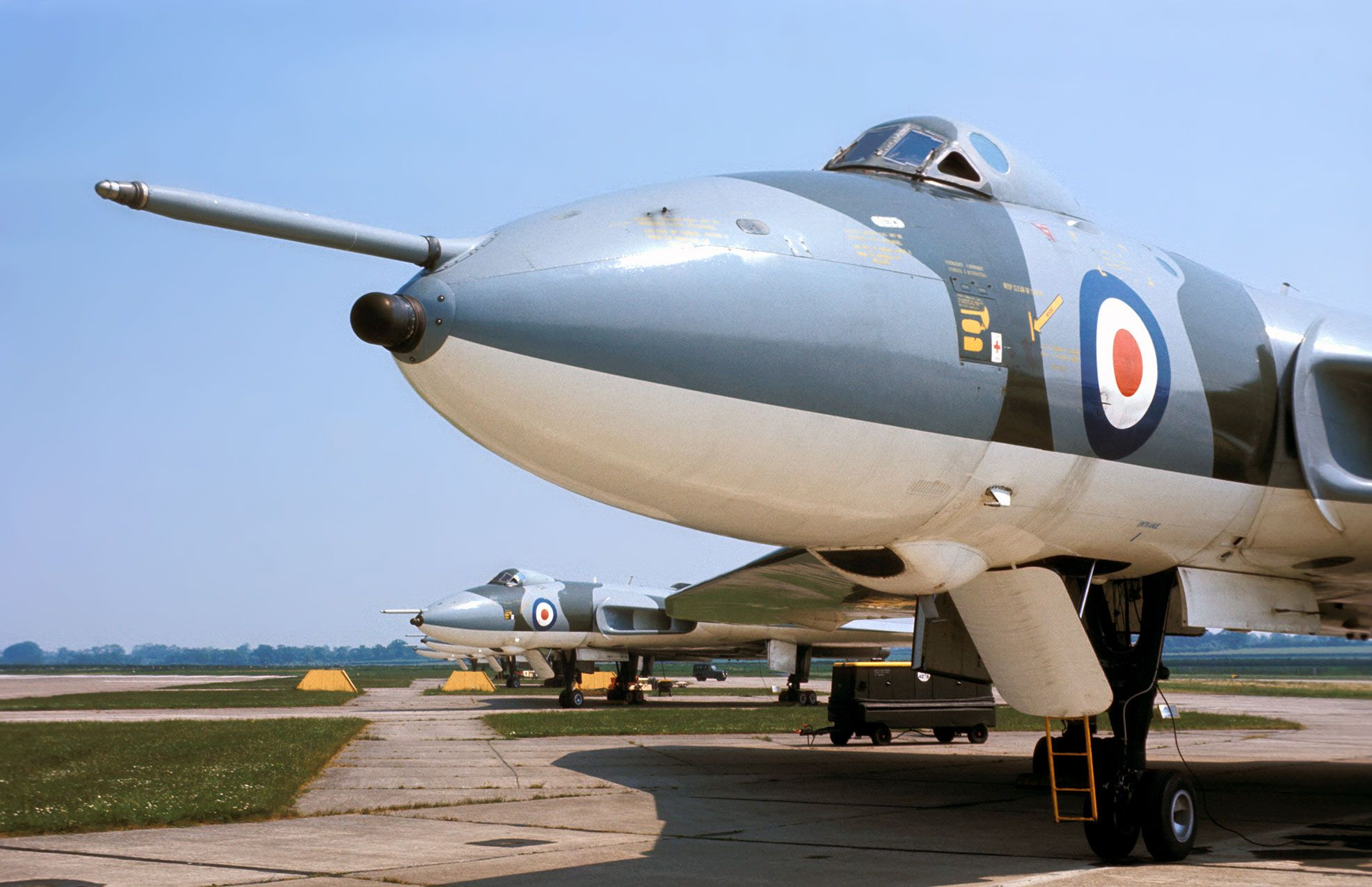
Avro Vulcan B.2s of No. 617 Squadron at RAF Cottesmore, Rutland, circa 1975.

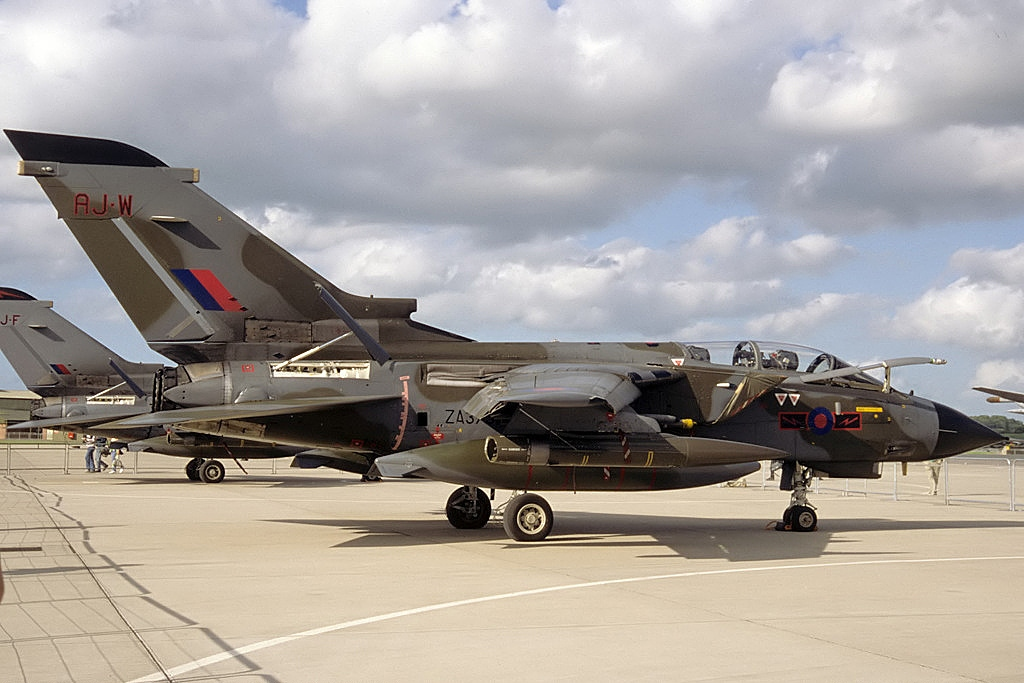
A Panavia Tornado GR1 in No. 617 Squadron markings at RAF Marham, Norfolk, in 1998.

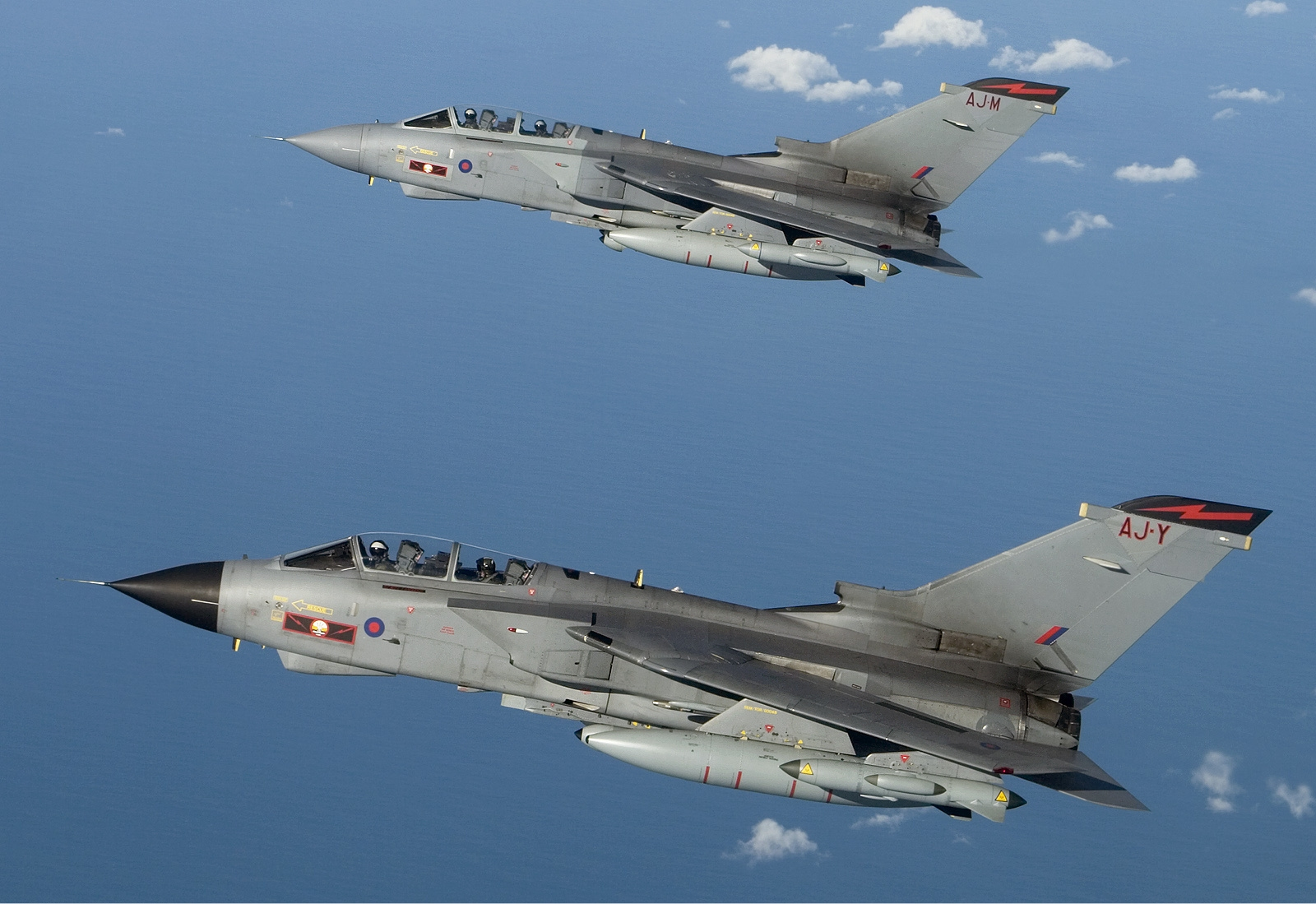
Two Panavia Tornado GR4s of No. 617 Squadron, displaying later markings used on the Tornados.

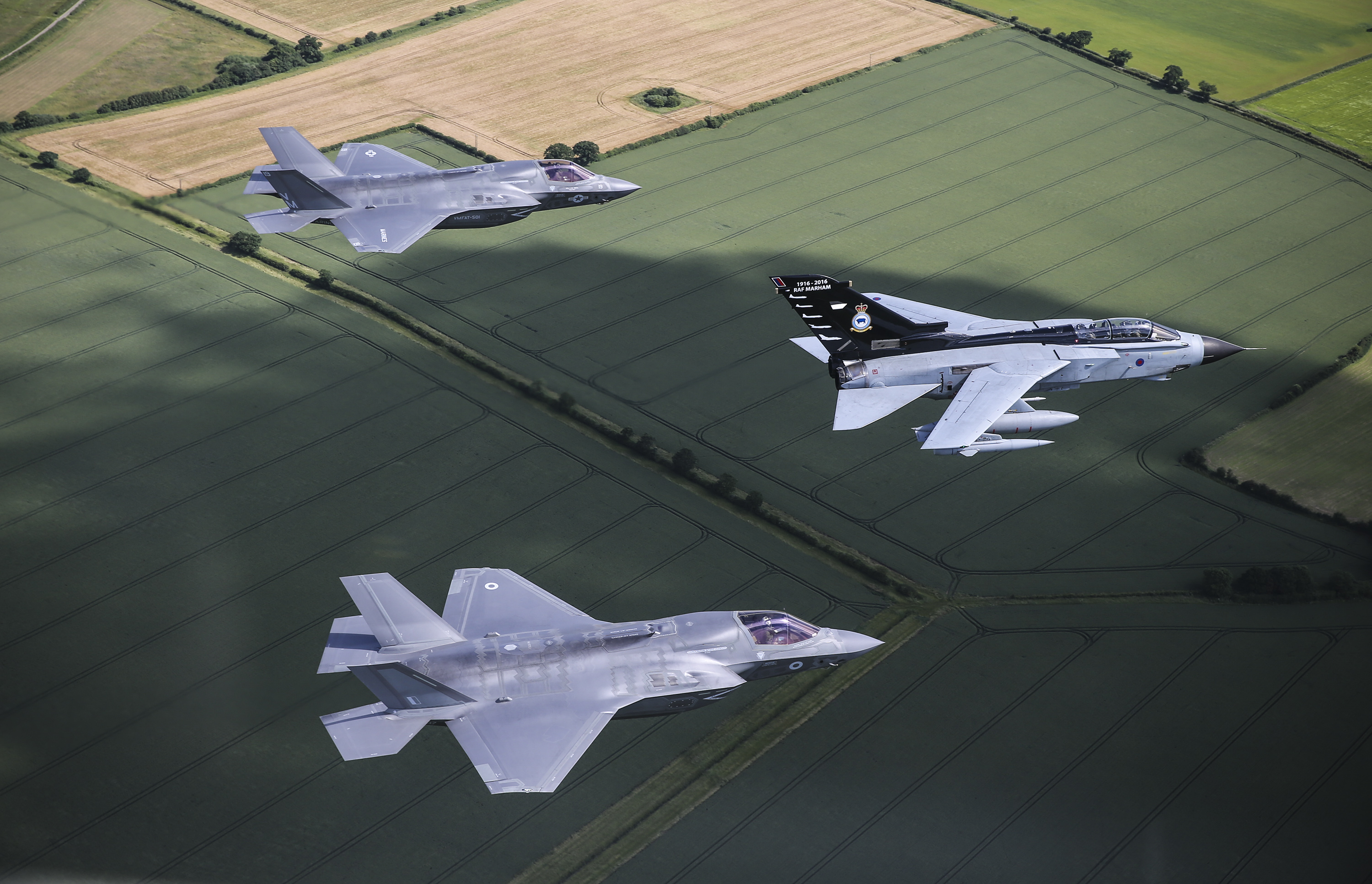
A pair of F-35B Lightnings operating alongside a Tornado GR4

== Battle honours ==
No. 617 Squadron has received the following battle honours. Those marked with an asterisk (*) may be emblazoned on the squadron standard.

- Fortress Europe (1943–1945)*
- The Dams (1943)*
- Biscay Ports (1944)*
- France and Germany (1944–1945)*
- Normandy (1944)*
- Tirpitz*
- Channel & North Sea (1944–1945)*
- German Ports (1945)*
- Gulf (1991)
- Afghanistan (2001–2014)
- Iraq (2003–2011)

== Commanding officers ==
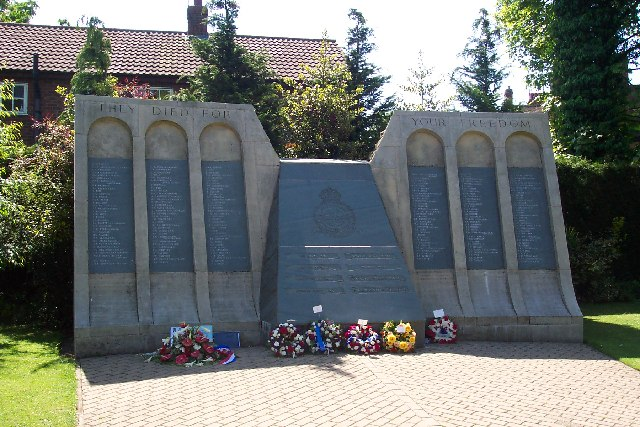
Dam Busters memorial at Woodhall Spa, Lincolnshire

The following men have commanded No. 617 Squadron:

=== 1943–1955 ===
- March 1943, Wing Commander Guy Gibson
- August 1943, Wing Commander George Holden
- September 1943 Squadron Leader Harold Martin
- November 1943, Wing Commander Leonard Cheshire
- July 1944, Wing Commander James Brian Tait
- December 1944, Wing Commander John Emilius Fauquier
- April 1945, Wing Commander John Grindon
- June 1945, Wing Commander C Fothergill
- April 1946, Squadron Leader C K Saxelby
- May 1947, Wing Commander C D Milne (for goodwill visit to USA)
- July 1947, Squadron Leader C K Saxelby
- February 1948, Squadron Leader P G Brodie
- May 1950, Squadron Leader W H Thallon
- June 1952, Squadron Leader M J O'Bryen-Nichols
- Dec 1952, Squadron Leader D Roberts
- May 1954, Squadron Leader J A Ruck (Squadron disbanded December 1955)

=== 1958–1981 ===
- May 1958, Wing Commander D Bower (Squadron reformed with Vulcans)
- May 1960, Wing Commander L G A Bastard
- December 1962, Wing Commander H G Currell
- March 1965, Wing Commander D G L Heywood
- March 1967, Wing Commander R C Allen
- March 1969, Wing Commander C A Vasey
- March 1971, Wing Commander F M A Hines
- October 1973, Wing Commander V L Warrington
- September 1975, Wing Commander R B Gilvary
- July 1977, Wing Commander F Mason (brief tenure due to illness)
- July 1977, Wing Commander J N Stephenson-Oliver
- August 1979, Wing Commander J N Herbertson (Squadron disbanded December 1981)

=== 1983–2014 ===
- January 1983, Wing Commander A J Harrison (Squadron reformed with Tornados)
- June 1985, Wing Commander P J J Day
- January 1988, Wing Commander N J Day
- May 1990, Wing Commander R D Iveson
- March 1993, Wing Commander J H Dickinson
- July 1995, Wing Commander I L Dugmore
- March 1998, Wing Commander G E Thwaites
- September 2000, Wing Commander D G Robertson
- July 2003, Wing Commander A Monkman
- January 2006, Wing Commander S P Rochelle
- January 2008, Wing Commander D J E Cooper
- October 2010, Wing Commander K D Taylor
- October 2012, Wing Commander D S Arthurton (Squadron disbanded 2014)

=== 2017–present ===
- December 2017, Wing Commander J R Butcher (Squadron reformed with F-35 Lightnings)
- April 2020, Commander Mark Sparrow (Squadron commanded by a Royal Navy officer for the first time in its history)
- 13 May 2022, Wing Commander Dave Tait (Commander Sparrow leaves on promotion to Captain Air Group HMS Queen Elizabeth)
- 5 August 2022, Wing Commander Stew Campbell (Former Red Arrows Pilot and previous 617 Squadron Tornado Pilot)
- 12 September 2024, Lieutenant Colonel Mike Carty, first Royal Marine to command any fast jet formation.

== In popular culture ==
The Second World War exploits of the squadron and Chastise in particular, were described in Guy Gibson's own 1944 account Enemy Coast Ahead, as well as Paul Brickhill's 1951 book The Dam Busters and a 1955 film, though the accuracy and completeness of these accounts were compromised by many of the documents relating to the war years still being secured by the Official Secrets Act. The definitive work however is considered The Dambusters Raid by John Sweetman.

In 2006, it was announced that New Zealand film director Peter Jackson and David Frost would co-produce a re-make of the film. It was scripted by Stephen Fry, and intended to be directed by Christian Rivers. The last living Dam Buster pilot at the time, New Zealander Les Munro (1919–2015), offered his services as a technical adviser.

== See also ==
- List of Royal Air Force aircraft squadrons
- Operation Chastise, the attack by 617 Squadron on German dams during the Second World War
- Operation Garlic, an attack by 617 Squadron on the Dortmund-Ems Canal.
- Operation Catechism, the sinking of German battleship Tirpitz by 617 Squadron
- Enemy Coast Ahead a book by Guy Gibson written in 1944 shortly before his death
- The Dam Busters a 1951 book by Paul Brickhill about the operation.
- The Dam Busters, a 1955 film about the operation based on both the Gibson and Brickhill books
