= Jo Salter =

British aviation pioneer

Joanna Salter MBE

Director at PwC

Personal details
- Born: 27 August 1968 (age 57) Bournemouth, England, United Kingdom
- Known for: First operational female RAF combat fighter pilot
- Nickname: Jo

Military service
- Allegiance: United Kingdom
- Branch/service: Royal Air Force
- Years of service: 1986–2000
- Rank: Flight Lieutenant
- Unit: 617 Squadron

Joanna Mary Salter MBE (born 27 August 1968, in Bournemouth) is a former Royal Air Force pilot, and was Britain's first female fast jet pilot flying the Panavia Tornado ground attack aircraft with 617 Squadron. She later became an inspirational speaker. In November 2016 she joined PwC as a director and Chief of Staff, responsible for digital capabilities within the People and Organisation practice.

== Early life ==
She attended the Shirley High School. Later she attended the John Ruskin High School from 1982 to 1986, gaining eight O-levels with six B grades. She gained A-levels in Maths, Physics, and Electronics. She lived on Brownlow Road.

== Royal Air Force ==
Salter joined the Royal Air Force at the age of 18 with the intention of becoming an engineering officer but she went on to train as a pilot after the British government announced that women would be allowed to fly jet aircraft in 1992. As part of her engineering training she had studied at the Royal Military College of Science. Salter was awarded her wings on 3 April 1992 and at the end of 1992 she finished her fast jet training at RAF Brawdy with Dawn Hadlow (nee Bradley), who became Britain's first RAF female flight instructor.

In August 1994 Salter joined 617 Squadron at RAF Lossiemouth in August 1994 as a flight lieutenant, and was declared "combat ready" by the RAF on 21 February 1995. Salter was the first woman to be an operational Tornado pilot and she later flew from both Turkey and Saudi Arabia in protection of the no-fly zone over Iraq. Whilst flying ground attack Tornados, Salter started an MBA course with the Open University in 1996, being sponsored by the MoD, she completed the course in 1999.

She appeared on Record Breakers on Friday 15 December 1995.

Following maternity leave Salter left the RAF in 2000 to become head of technical services with an IT infrastructure company.

== Awards ==
Salter was appointed Member of the Order of the British Empire (MBE) in the 2022 New Year Honours for services to aviation.

Also in 2022, Salter was awarded an Honorary Doctor of Arts from Bournemouth University, in recognition of her efforts to promote inclusivity and motivate others.

== See also ==
- Julie Ann Gibson – first female pilot in the RAF
- Ulrike Fitzer and Nicola Winter, Germany's first two female fast jet fighter pilots
- Martha McSally, the US first female combat pilot
