= Bognor Regis branch line =

The Bognor Regis branch line is a short branch railway line in West Sussex. It is a branch of the West Coastway Line, a main line railway running from Brighton to Portsmouth and Southampton. The branch forms a trailing connection with the main line immediately West of the platforms at Barnham railway station and then proceeds in a broadly southwards direction for 3.5 miles to Bognor Regis, where all trains terminate. All trains using the branch to or from Bognor Regis stop at Barnham. The branch is operated with a shuttle train service from Barnham but this is supplemented with through trains to and from Littlehampton and London Victoria. The terminus of the line is Bognor Regis railway station. All trains on the line are operated by Southern. There is only one station on the branch, the terminus at Bognor Regis.

== History ==
The London Brighton and South Coast Railway had opened the main Coastway line as far as Chichester by 1846 and a station on it named Bognor was located at Woodgate, some 4 miles from Bognor. From that time onwards there were plans for a branch to Bognor, to provide a more convenient rail connection to the town. After many failed proposals the Bognor branch was finally opened on 1 June 1864, along with a new station at the junction, named Barnham. The original station called Bognor, about a mile West of Barnham, and another small station at Yapton, East of Barnham, both closed on the same date. When opened, the line was single track but was doubled throughout in 1911. As part of the conversion to double track, the opportunity was taken to re-organise the main line connection at Barnham, to allow through running onto the branch from the London direction, which until that time had not been possible.

== Electrification ==
The branch was electrified throughout in 1938 along with the West Coastway line as part of the Southern Railway electrification programme. The standard Southern electric traction system using 750 V DC current was installed, power being drawn from a "third" rail alongside the running line. That same operating system is still in use today.

== Service ==
All trains on the line are operated by Southern. The typical Monday to Saturday service is four trains per hour. This is reduced to two trains per hour on a Sunday,

Preceding station	National Rail	Following station
Barnham	Southern; West Coastway; Bognor Regis branch	Terminus
