= Aircrew brevet =

Aircrew badge in RAF, British Army and other commonwealth nations

An aircrew flying badge (unofficially and incorrectly known as an aircrew brevet – which is actually French for a diploma or certificate) is the badge worn on the left breast, above any medal ribbons, by qualified aircrew in the Royal Air Force, Royal Navy, British Army, Indian Air Force, Pakistan Air Force, Royal Canadian Air Force, Royal Australian Navy, Australian Army, Royal Australian Air Force, Royal New Zealand Air Force, South African Air Force and Sri Lanka Air Force. An example of a real pilot brevet (i.e. certificate) is shown:

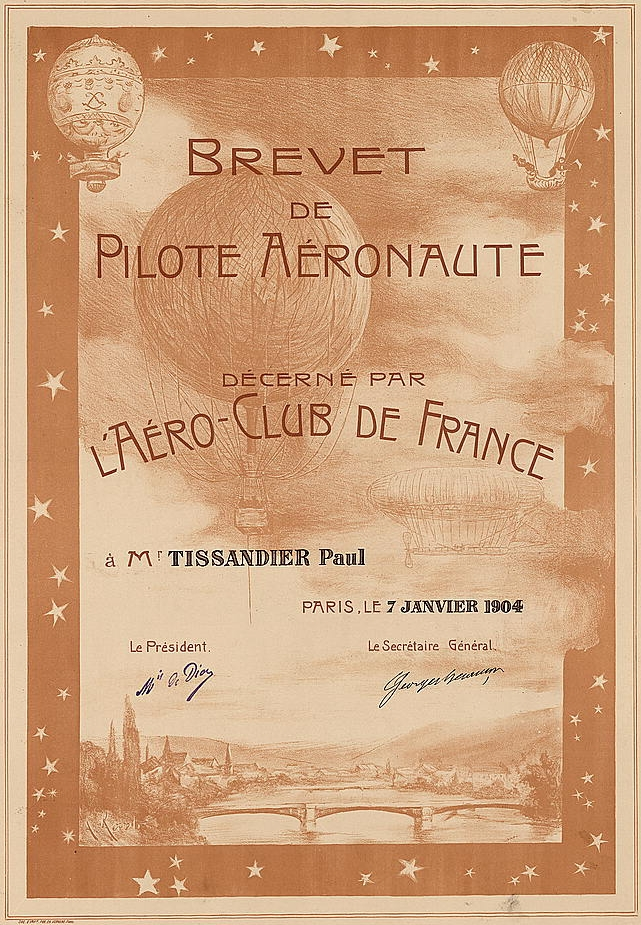
Balloon pilot's licence certificate (or "brevet") issued by the Aéro-Club de France to Paul Tissandier in 1904

== United Kingdom ==
=== Royal Air Force ===
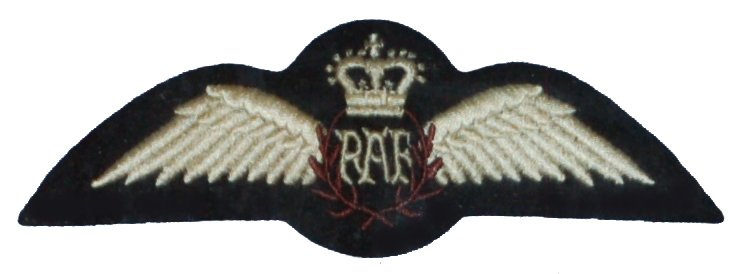
Royal Air Force Pilot Flying Badge

In the RAF, the Flying Badge (colloquially referred to as wings), is awarded upon the completion of a significant stage of flying training. Aircrew first undertake Elementary Flying Training, and are then streamed to either fast jet, helicopter, RPAS or multi-engine pipelines. The award of wings usually occurs upon completion of the secondary phase of training; for example, in the fast jet stream, wings are awarded upon completion of the Basic Fast Jet Course (BJFT), currently at RAF Valley; for helicopter pilots, wings are awarded after they complete helicopter training at RAF Shawbury pre-OCU; for RPAS post-FTU (Formal Training Unit) and on the attainment of "Limited Combat Ready" status, and for multi-engine aircrew, wings are awarded upon completion of their Multi-Engine Advanced Flying Training (MEAFT) training at RAF Cranwell. Aircrew, other than RPAS pilots, are then posted to their Operational Conversion Units having gained their wings, but still have a good deal of training and type familiarisation to complete before they are considered operational or front-line aircrew.

==== Current flying badges ====
- pilots wear the letters "RAF" in a brown laurel wreath, surmounted by St Edwards crown ( the crown worn by the sovereign at their coronation), with a swift's wing on each side.
- weapons systems officers/operators (Mission Aircrew) wear the letters "RAF" in a brown laurel wreath, surmounted by a crown, with a single swift's wing on one side.

Legacy Mission Aircrew who qualified prior to April 2003, wear a single wing with no crown and a letter or letters (denoting speciality) in a brown laurel wreath, however, they may choose to wear the new WSO/WSOP Flying Badge. Legacy flying badges still in use in the RAF but no longer issued, include:

- "N" for Navigator
- "AE" for Air Electronics Officer/Operator
- "LM" for Air Loadmaster
- "E" for Air Engineer
- "S" for Air Signaller (Airborne Linguist)

For other members of a flying crew, who are not de facto Aircrew (but since 1 Apr 20 have been known as Airborne Specialists) and who come from ground trades/branches but are assigned to flying duties, they are awarded an Airborne Specialist Flying Badge upon completion of a bespoke flying training course, which is a half wing, without crown and 2 letters in the centre. This includes:

- "FC" (fighter controller) flying badge – Air Battle Managers assigned to fly on Sentry AEW.1.
- "AT" (airborne technician) flying badge – Ground Engineers assigned to fly on Sentry AEW.1 and RC-135W Rivet Joint platforms as in-flight technicians.
- "IA" (Airborne imagery analyst) flying badge – Intelligence Analysts assigned to fly on Sentinel R.1 in an Airborne Imagery Analyst role .

RAF Catering Stewards assigned to fly as cabin crew on Voyager KC.1, BAe 146 and HS 125 are awarded the "CC" (cabin crew) badge. This badge is worn on the right sleeve in the same location as the parachute qualification, has two upturned wings (similar to Royal Navy ratings' aircrewman badges) and has cream stitching for the wings, lettering and laurels. Legacy Cabin Crew who qualified with the former "AS" (air steward) badge are still entitled to wear it.

Parachute Jumping Instructors (PJIs) are honorary aircrew and wear an open parachute instead of a letter on a half wing.

==== Obsolete flying badges ====
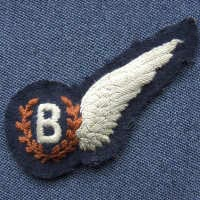
An obsolete bomb aimer's flying badge.

There are also a number of obsolete Mission Aircrew flying badges that are no longer in use such as:

- "AG" for Air Gunner
- "B" for Air Bomber
- "RO" for Radio Observer
- "M" (meteorological observer)
- "QM" (air quartermaster)
- Observers wore a single wing attached directly to the letter "O", this was replaced by the Navigator's badge in 1942.
- RPAS pilots initially had a separate flying badge, similar to traditional pilot wings excepting a light blue wreath, this was withdrawn on 1 April 2019.

==== Space personnel ====
Qualified space personnel wear 'UK Space Wings': a silver delta, an orbit ellipse, and a constellation of stars in a blue laurel wreath; with a single silver swift's wing on one side. The constellation is representative of Aries, referencing the date 1 April when UK Space Command was stood up. These badges are similar to flying badges, and are worn on the left breast above medals, but are actually qualification badges.

=== Royal Navy ===
The Royal Navy's Fleet Air Arm has its own wings design, bestowed in 1925 when it was the Fleet Air Arm of the Royal Air Force, featuring albatross wings instead of the wings of an eagle, as per the RAF design. The Fleet Air Arm wings badges also feature a crown and fouled anchor, reflecting the naval aspect of the flying undertaken. They are worn on the left sleeve of naval aviators, above the rank "rings" as opposed to on the left breast of uniforms, like the RAF and Army Air Corps. Unlike the RAF and the Army Air Corps, Naval aircrew are awarded their wings after Operational Conversion Unit (OCU), whereupon they are posted to a frontline squadron, the majority of their flying training complete. Therefore, while a Navy and RAF aircrew might take a similar amount of time to reach an operational squadron, the Naval officer has to wait until he has completed his conversion training to receive his wings.

Royal Naval Observers are awarded their own aircrew flying badge, consisting of shorter wings either side of a fouled anchor surmounted by a Crown.

Royal Naval Aircrewmen are awarded a flying badge similar in shape to the Observer wings, with slightly narrower wings and a similar anchor, but with no crown. Both observers and aircrewmen are also issued Wings upon completion of their OCU, like Royal Navy pilots.

All Royal Navy aircrew wear their wings on the left sleeve of the Number 1 dress uniform jacket, above any rank insignia.

=== British Army ===
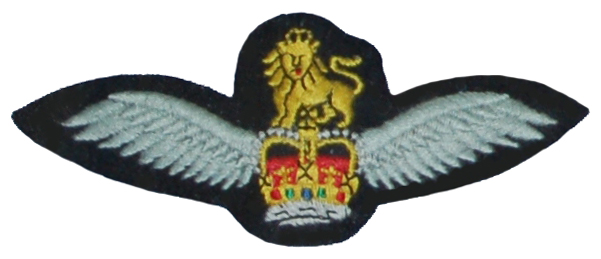
Army Air Corps Pilot Flying Badge

The Army Air Corps pilot wings are awarded upon completion of the basic helicopter course at RAF Shawbury and a subsequent Army course at Middle Wallop Airfield. Aircrew are then dispatched to their OCU to receive type training on either the Apache attack helicopter or the Wildcat battlefield support helicopter.

The Army is unique in the British military in that both Officers and Non-Commissioned Officers can become pilots and aircraft commanders. The wings are identical for both Officers and Other Ranks, and are worn on the left chest above any medals, similar to the RAF.

In all the services, award of wings does not confer any operational capability – this is declared by a front-line squadron once the student has reached satisfactory standard to allow them to be deployed operationally. This milestone, or 'Combat Ready Status', is the threshold necessary for the award of Flying Pay, a discretionary additional salary bonus for aircrew due to the nature of their work.

== Australia ==
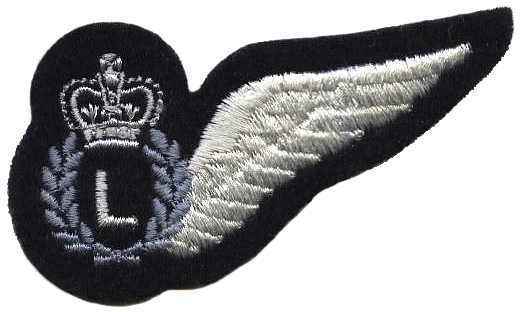
Royal Australian Air Force loadmaster flying badge

Royal Australian Air Force flying badges differ from those in the RAF mainly in having a crown on all Flying Badges (not just on pilot's wings) and in normally having blue wreaths. The pilot's flying badge has the letters "RAAF". A similar twin-wing badge, bearing the Southern Cross, was introduced for officer aircrew in 1998, replacing various single-wing flying badges previously worn by commissioned officers; however NCO aircrew continue to wear the old single-wing badges.

Some RAAF pilots signed a petition in 1998/1999 in protest of non-pilot "officer aircrew" receiving a double wing. It was rumoured that some serving navigators and war veterans who had previously held the soon to be abolished 'half' wing agreed with the protest. The petition ultimately had over 10,000 signatures, but in the end the petition was unsuccessful.

Australian Army flying badges

== New Zealand ==
The Royal New Zealand Air Force (RNZAF) uses a system of aircrew brevets, officially termed aircrew badges in RNZAF dress instructions. The pilot's brevet consists of a pair of wings with the letters "NZ" at the centre, surrounded by a laurel wreath and surmounted by a crown. Most other qualified aircrew wear a single-wing brevet of a similar pattern, with letters identifying the aircrew specialisation.

Current specialist brevets include:

- Air Warfare Officer and Air Warfare Specialist, which share the letters AW;
- Air Loadmaster (LM);
- Helicopter Loadmaster (HL);
- Flight Steward (FS);
- The Parachute Jump Instructor brevet differs from the lettered pattern, displaying a parachute within a laurel wreath, surmounted by a crown and accompanied by a single outspread wing.

A number of earlier aircrew brevets remain recognised for personnel who qualified in specialisations that are no longer trained by the RNZAF. These include Navigator (N), Air Electronics Officer or Operator (AE), Air Signaller (S), Air Quartermaster (QM), Helicopter Crewman (HC), and Air Ordnance Specialist (AO). Qualified personnel may continue to wear the appropriate badge despite the specialisation becoming obsolescent or transfer to other service arms.

The Air Engineer brevet (E) was associated principally with the RNZAF's multi-engine transport aircraft, including the C-130H Hercules. The introduction of the C-130J Hercules eliminated the air engineer position from the normal Hercules flight crew; the C-130J is normally operated by two pilots and two air loadmasters. The RNZAF's C-130H fleet was retired in 2025.

On service dress, aircrew brevets are worn above the left breast pocket. Metal versions may be worn on service dress shirts, while mess-dress versions are half-size and embroidered in gold. Personnel qualified for more than one aircrew badge normally wear the badge appropriate to their current appointment, or to their most recent employment as aircrew.

== See also ==
- Aircrew badge
- Aviator badge
- Parachutist badge
- Pilot licensing and certification
