= Julie Ann Gibson =

First full-time female pilot for the Royal Air Force

- Born: 1963 (age 62–63)
- Education: City, University of London
- Known for: First female pilot for the RAF
- Aviation career
- Famous flights: C-130 Hercules, HS 780 Andover
- Air force: Royal Air Force
- Rank: Flight Lieutenant

Flight Lieutenant Julie Ann Gibson was the first full-time female pilot for the Royal Air Force when she graduated in 1991. Previously a ground-based officer, later selected for flying training, she was subsequently assigned to No. 32 Squadron RAF flying Hawker Siddeley Andovers, and following her promotion to Flight Lieutenant, Lockheed C-130 Hercules at RAF Lyneham.

== Career ==
Julie Ann Gibson was born into a military family; her father was a Lieutenant commander in the Royal Navy. Because of his military career, Gibson travelled frequently during her childhood as he was posted in different ports around the world. She attended the City, University of London, where she graduated in 1983 with a Bachelor of Science degree in aeronautical engineering. While at University, she had learnt to fly and had joined the associated University Air Squadron.

Gibson joined the Royal Air Force College Cranwell in 1984 and, following her officer training, she was posted to 74(F) Sqn based at RAF Wattisham in Suffolk. She was initially in charge of 75 engineers supporting the F4J variant of the McDonnell Douglas F-4 Phantom II. In her following assignment, she commanded 160 men in the Tactical Weapons Unit at RAF Brawdy

She successfully applied for pilot training, going on to train in the Advanced Flying Training Wing. Alongside fellow female pilot Sally Cox, Gibson took her first solo flights in 1990 at RAF Linton-on-Ouse. She graduated as the first female pilot in the RAF on 14 June 1991 at No. 6 Flying Training School RAF, within RAF Finningley. She was the second RAF commissioned aircrew, after Anne-Marie Dawe, who was the first RAF commissioned aircrew in March 1991, when she had qualified as a navigator.

She was assigned to No. 32 Squadron RAF, where she flew Hawker Siddeley Andovers out of RAF Northolt. She was subsequently promoted to Flight Lieutenant, and assigned to fly Lockheed C-130 Hercules at RAF Lyneham.

== See also ==
- Jo Salter - first female combat pilot for the RAF
