= Mary Rundle =

Superintendent of the WRNS (1907–2010)

Mary Rundle CBE
- Rundle in April 1948
- Born: Mary Beatrice Rundle; 10 August 1907; Highfield, Southampton, England
- Died: 29 September 2010 (aged 103); Lancashire, England
- Education: Harrogate Ladies' College
- Occupations: Personal secretary; business director; chair of charitable trust
- Relatives: Geoffrey Bennett (cousin); Mary Snell Rundle (aunt)
- Military service
- Allegiance: United Kingdom
- Branch: Women's Royal Naval Service
- Service years: 1939–1949
- Rank: Superintendent
- Commands: HMS Calliope; HMS Daedalus
- Conflict: World War II

Mary Beatrice Rundle CBE (10 August 1907 – 29 September 2010) was the first officer in charge of the Women's Royal Naval Service (WRNS) at Portsmouth during World War II. At the end of the war, she was promoted to superintendent, the third highest post in the service. She was born at Highfield, Southampton, the younger daughter of engineer rear admiral Mark Rundle. She was educated at Sheffield High School for Girls, where she won an open scholarship to study at Harrogate Ladies' College. In the 1930s, she was employed as Sir Anderson Montague-Barlow's personal secretary.

As World War II approached, Rundle was commissioned into the WRNS and undertook officer training at the Royal Naval College, Greenwich. In 1940, she was appointed first officer at Portsmouth. She later served at HMS Calliope, then a training centre for the Royal Naval Reserve, located in Gateshead, Tyne and Wear, and HMS Daedalus, a shore airfield, located near Lee-on-the-Solent in Hampshire. At the end of the war, Rundle joined the staff of the WRNS directorate and put in place plans to establish the WRNS as a permanent peacetime service. She was promoted to superintendent, equivalent to a commander in the Royal Navy, and second only in seniority to the then director. In 1948, she was awarded a CBE in the King's Birthday Honours.

Rundle was a founding trustee of the WRNS Benevolent Trust, and was elected vice-chair of the trust from 1947 to 1950, and chair from 1950 to 1958. In 1949, she left the WRNS after being appointed deputy director of Encyclopædia Britannica Films in the United Kingdom. After 1951, she joined Metal Box Company Limited, a large can and packaging manufacturer, as secretary to the managing director. In the early 1960s, she retired and moved to a cottage in Outgate, a hamlet near Hawkshead, in the Lake District, Cumbria. In retirement, she indexed the naval histories written by her cousin Geoffrey Bennett. In 2007, a party was held at her home to mark her hundredth birthday. She died in a hospital from the effects of a stroke.

== Early life and education ==
Rundle was born on 10 August 1907 at Sherwood, Highfield, Southampton, the younger daughter of Mark Rundle and Elsie Cameron, née Bennett. They had married on 28 March 1901 at the Elm Grove Baptist Church, Southsea, Portsmouth. Rundle's mother was the only daughter of engineer rear admiral James Martin Cameron Bennett. She was a justice of the peace for Aylesbury, Buckinghamshire, and a member of the Church of England's Advisory Council for Moral Welfare Work. Rundle's father was raised in Saltash, Cornwall, the eldest child of John Peter Rundle and Mary, née Snell. His brother was the medical superintendent at Aintree University Hospital, in Fazakerley, Liverpool, and his sister, Mary Snell Rundle, was the first ever secretary of the Royal College of Nursing.

Rundle's father began his Royal Navy career in 1892 as an engineer lieutenant and was promoted to engineer commander on 6 July 1909. He served on HMS Lion during World War I and was mentioned in dispatches. He received the Distinguished Service Order (DSO) for his conduct in the Battle of Jutland, and in 1918, he was awarded the Chevalier of the Legion of Honour. At the end of the war, he was in charge of steel production for the Admiralty at Sheffield, South Yorkshire. By 1923, he had been promoted to engineer captain, and in June of that year, he joined Battlecruiser Squadron as engineer officer. In 1925, he was promoted to engineer rear admiral.

Rundle was educated at Sheffield High School for Girls, where in February 1920, she passed the Associated Board of the Royal Schools of Music piano examination. In the same year, she won an open scholarship from the Sheffield Education Committee to study at Harrogate Ladies' College. At the college, she acted in a number of plays and, moreover, music and the theatre would remain an interest throughout her life. In 1923, she passed the London General School Examination. Her elder sister, Nancy Marguerite, was also educated at Harrogate Ladies' College, and afterwards, at Bedford College for Women, London. She married Robert Arthur Balfour, 2nd Baron Riverdale of Sheffield, on 1 September 1926 at Highfield Church, Southampton. However, she died after a short illness on 8 August 1928, aged 24, at Ropes, Fernhurst, the home of her father-in-law, Sir Arthur Balfour.

== Career ==
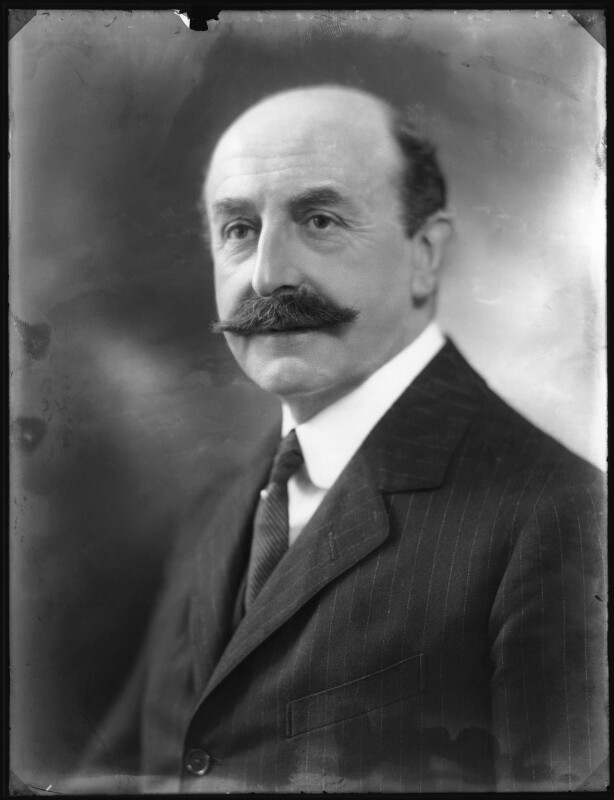
In the 1930s, Rundle was employed as Sir Anderson Montague-Barlow's personal secretary

By September 1932, Rundle was employed as personal secretary to Sir Anderson Montague-Barlow, a former Minister of Labour, and best known for chairing the Barlow Royal Commission on the urban concentration of population and industry. In 1935, he was appointed chairman of the Royal Commission on the Coal Industry in Alberta, Canada, From late summer to autumn of 1935, Rundle accompanied Barlow, his wife Doris Louise, née Reed, a former administrator in the Women's Royal Air Force, and William Armour, a mining expert, on a journey across Canada Her mother had recently died on 17 July 1935, however, her father insisted that she "should honour [her] undertaking and go to Canada." She kept a running diary of the entire trip that she later donated to the Provincial Archives of Alberta. (Note: See "'The Country Was Looking Wonderful': Insights on 1930s Alberta from the Travel Diary of Mary Beatrice Rundle" (2017), by Sterling Evans, for a detailed description of Rundle's trip across Canada.)

As World War II approached, she was commissioned into the Women's Royal Naval Service (WRNS) and undertook officer training at the Royal Naval College, Greenwich. On 26 August 1939, she was appointed a first officer in the WRNS at Portsmouth, under the command of Sir William James. She also served at HMS Calliope, then a training centre for the Royal Naval Reserve, located in Gateshead, Tyne and Wear, and HMS Daedalus, a shore airfield, located near Lee-on-the-Solent in Hampshire, for a number of naval air squadrons of the Fleet Air Arm.

At the end of the war, Rundle joined the staff of the WRNS directorate and put in place plans to establish the WRNS as a permanent peacetime service. She was promoted to superintendent, equivalent to a commander in the Royal Navy, and second only in seniority to the then director, Jocelyn Woollcombe. In 1948, she was awarded a CBE in the King's Birthday Honours. In April 1949, Rundle left the WRNS after being appointed deputy director of Encyclopædia Britannica Films, at 211 Piccadilly, London, a position that reported to John Mackay Mure, then director of the division in the United Kingdom. (Note: On 29 June 1949, Rundle wrote from the offices of Encyclopædia Britannica Films to Andrew Sydenham Farrar Gow, asking for permission to reproduce a 12th century line drawing of a plough that was published in volume 1 of The Cambridge Economic History of Europe (1942).)

The Encyclopædia Britannica Films division in the United States had a library of around four hundred educational films that they had planned to offer to the Ministry of Education in London. The films were distributed on 16 mm film and covered, amongst other subjects, geography, science, and social studies. In April 1951, the work of the UK division was transferred to Lexicon Films Limited, an Encyclopædia Britannica affiliate located at 10 St Swithin's Lane, in the City of London. Lexicon Films was wound-up on 1 November 1954. After 1951, Rundle joined Metal Box Company Limited, a large can and packaging manufacturer, as secretary to the managing director. (Note: Probably David Ducat, who was managing director of Metal Box from 1949 to 1966.) In the early 1960s, she retired and moved to a cottage in Outgate, a hamlet near Hawkshead, in the Lake District, Cumbria.

== Personal life and death ==
Rundle never married but her father married twice after the death of her mother. He married Margaret Wilson, of Ifield, West Sussex, on 8 January 1938 at All Souls', Langham Place, London. She died on 21 June 1942, and he married thirdly, Mildred Ellen Robinson, on 21 August 1944 at the parish church of Maresfield in the Wealden district of East Sussex. Mildred was the widow of Reginald Braham Robinson, a former civil engineer with the Ministry of Works and Public Buildings. Rundle's father died on 8 October 1958, aged 86, at his home in Maresfield.

Rundle was a founding trustee of the WRNS Benevolent Trust, and was elected vice-chair of the trust from 1947 to 1950, and chair from 1950 to 1958. In retirement, she indexed the naval histories written by her cousin Geoffrey Bennett, that Eric Grove, late professor of naval history at the University of Salford, has previously described as an "excellent index". She also indexed the records of the Outgate Women's Institute after they were deposited with the Cumbria Archive Service in 1990. In 2007, a party was held at her home to mark her hundredth birthday. She died from the effects of a stroke on 29 September 2010, aged 103, at a hospital in Lancashire. A memorial service was held at Hawkshead parish church on 12 October 2010.

== See also ==
- Margaret Cooper
- Nancy Robertson
- Jocelyn Woollcombe

== Bibliography ==
- Parain, Charles (1942) [First published 1941]. "3. The Evolution of Agricultural Technique". In Clapham, John Harold; Power, Eileen (eds.). The Cambridge Economic History of Europe: From the decline of the Roman empire. Vol. 1 (2nd ed.). Cambridge: Cambridge University Press. pp. 118–168. ISSN 0068-6646. OCLC 6526829.

See also page xvi, plate illustrations, V. The plough, (iv) Twelfth-century wheeled plough, also with coulter and mould-board. Note, the line drawing of the plough was first published in Gow, Andrew Sydenham Farrar (1914). "The Ancient Plough". The Journal of Hellenic Studies. 1. London: Macmillan and Company: 249–275. doi:10.2307/624502. ISSN 0075-4269. JSTOR 624502. OCLC 436724650. S2CID 163379831. See figure 14 on page 261.

- Rundle, Mary Beatrice (February 1935). "Tracing authorities and checking references". Supplement to Barlow Family Records (PDF). By Montague-Barlow, Anderson (1st ed.). London: Bemrose & Sons. pp. 1–21. OCLC 22169994. Archived from the original (PDF) on 28 December 2022 – via Seeking my Roots.
