= Mary Lloyd (WRNS officer) =

Commandant Dame Mary Lloyd DBE
- Born: Mary Kathleen Lloyd; 31 May 1902; Eastbourne, East Sussex
- Died: 3 April 1972 (aged 69)
- Spouse: Geoffrey Cheshire (m. 1963)
- Military career
- Allegiance: United Kingdom
- Branch: Women's Royal Naval Service
- Service years: 1939–1954
- Rank: Commandant
- Commands: Women's Royal Naval Service
- Conflicts: Second World War
- Awards: Dame Commander of the Order of the British Empire

Dame Mary Kathleen Cheshire, DBE (née Lloyd; 31 May 1902 – 3 April 1972) was a director of the Women's Royal Naval Service (WRNS).

== Early life ==
Lloyd was born in Eastbourne, East Sussex, on 31 May 1902 to Aloysius Joseph Lloyd, a draper, and his wife, Annie (née Grant). She was educated at the Ursuline convent in Wimbledon.

== Naval career ==
Lloyd was the first woman to join the Women's Royal Naval Service (WRNS) when it was re-formed in 1939, and began her service as a steward. The following year she was commissioned as an officer. By 1946 she was acting superintendent, for which service she was appointed an Officer of the Order of the British Empire in the 1946 Birthday Honours. The WRNS was not disbanded after the war, and in 1950 Lloyd succeeded Dame Jocelyn Woollcombe as its director (most senior officer, equivalent to a rear admiral). She was named a Dame Commander of the Order of the British Empire in 1952 and retired two years later.

== Personal life ==
Lloyd married Geoffrey Cheshire, father of the war hero and humanitarian Leonard Cheshire, in 1963. She spent a number of years working with her stepson's eponymous Cheshire Foundation.

Her requiem mass was held at Westminster Cathedral on 28 July 1972, and attended by Queen Elizabeth II.
