= Ken Gamby =

- Origin: London
- Genres: Mod revival
- Instrument: Drums

Ken Gamby was the English drummer for The Fixations from 1977 to 1980. Originally joining the band in 1975 with a new drum kit, haircut and scooter, he left the band temporarily during a period when the line-up was incomplete, and joined a mod trio called Relay, who played a number of school discos and pubs around Islington, London.

In 1977, following a Relay gig, Paul Cattini was spurred on to find a bass player and completed the line-up for The Fixations.

After leaving the band, Gamby played the congas at the Green Street Green Baptist Church, and runs drum workshops for people with disabilities, working with organisations such as Mencap in Bromley, CASPA and Leonard Cheshire Disability.

He had a mention in the mod fanzine, Maximum Speed.
