= LMF =

LMF may refer to:

- Lack of Moral Fibre, RAF World War II designation for air crew unwilling to fly
- Lamb-Mössbauer factor, in solid-state spectroscopy
- Lazy Mutha Fucka, a Cantonese hip-hop band from Hong Kong
- Lexical Markup Framework, the ISO standard for lexicons
- Licentiate in Medicine and Surgery, a medical degree
- Linked Media Framework, predecessor of Apache Marmotta
- Lancaster Music Festival, in Lancaster, Lancashire, UK
