= David Goodall (diplomat) =

British diplomat (1931–2016)

Sir Arthur David Saunders Goodall, GCMG (9 October 1931 – 22 July 2016) was a British diplomat. He was High Commissioner to India from 1987 to 1991.

== Early life ==
Goodall was born on 9 October 1931 in Blackpool, Lancashire. His paternal grandfather was from Wexford, Ireland. He was educated at Ampleforth College in North Yorkshire, and Trinity College, Oxford where he gained first class honours.

== Military service ==
Goodall was commissioned as a 2nd Lieutenant in the King's Own Yorkshire Light Infantry in the 1950s, he served in Kenya and Cyprus.

== Diplomatic career ==
Goodall joined the diplomatic service in 1956 and served in Austria, Germany, Indonesia and Kenya, before spending 1987-1991 as the British High Commissioner, the equivalent of Ambassador, in India. He also spent time working in the Cabinet Office, where he helped negotiate the 1985 Anglo-Irish Agreement.

After his retirement he was Chairman of the Leonard Cheshire Foundation, 1995–2000, and President of the Irish Genealogical Research Society, 1992–2010.

During the 1980s, Goodall was one of the most senior British officials representing the United Kingdom negotiating with the Irish government on Northern Ireland.

Goodall was a Knight of the Order of St. Gregory the Great (KSG).

He died on 22 July 2016 at the age of 84.

== Art ==
Goodall was taught to paint at Ampleforth College, but started to paint seriously some twenty years later after reading Winston Churchill's book Painting as a Pastime. He worked in ink and watercolour, and held one-man shows in North Yorkshire, London, Durham, Hull and Delhi. He published two books of his paintings: Remembering India (1997, Scorpion Cavendish; ISBN 978-1900269056) and Ryedale Pilgrimage (2000, Maxiprint; ISBN 978-1871125474).
