= Geoffrey Cheshire =

British barrister (1886-1978)

Geoffrey Chevalier Cheshire FBA
- Cheshire in 1946
- Born: 27 June 1886
- Died: 27 October 1978 (aged 92)
- Education: Merton College, Oxford; Lincoln's Inn
- Occupation: Barrister
- Notable work: Modern Law of Real Property
- Spouses: Burella Primrose Eleanor Barstow (m. 1915; died 1962) Mary Lloyd (m. 1963; died 1972)
- Children: 2, including Leonard

Geoffrey Chevalier Cheshire FBA (27 June 1886 – 27 October 1978) was a British barrister and legal scholar. He was the father of Leonard Cheshire, the British war hero and founder of the Cheshire Foundation Homes for the Sick.

== Biography ==
Born in 1886 to Walter Christopher Cheshire, of Northwich, Cheshire, a solicitor (also Registrar of Northwich County Court) and Major (Honorary Lieutenant Colonel) of the 3rd Volunteer Battalion, Cheshire Regiment, and Clara (née Cook), he was educated at Denstone College and Merton College, Oxford, from which he obtained a first class honours degree in Jurisprudence in 1908.

He received a Lectureship in Law at the University College of Wales, Aberystwyth, working for Professor T.A. Levi, but returned to Oxford in 1911, where he was elected to a fellowship in law at Exeter College in 1912.

He served in the First World War, 1914–19, with 2/6 Battalion Cheshire Regiment and the Royal Flying Corps: he retired with the rank of captain.

He became a barrister (Lincoln's Inn) in 1922 and, in the same year took on the additional office of All Souls' Lecturer in Private International Law. He was All Souls reader in English Law, from 1933, and a fellow of All Souls College, Oxford, from 1944 to 1949. In 1944 he was elected Vinerian Professor of English Law and there followed a succession of other honours: honorary bencher of Lincoln's Inn (1944); honorary Fellow of Merton College, Oxford (1945); honorary Fellow of Exeter College, Oxford; honorary LLD London and Manchester; and Fellow of the British Academy.

He married Burella Primrose Eleanor Barstow, daughter of Lieutenant Colonel Thomas Anderson Adam Barstow, on 6 February 1915. They had two children: (Geoffrey) Leonard Cheshire and Christopher Cheshire, who was also a wartime pilot. In 1963, a year after the death of his first wife, Geoffrey Cheshire married Dame Mary Lloyd (1902–1972), daughter of A.J. Lloyd, and a former director of the WRNS. Geoffrey Cheshire outlived his second wife as well, and died in 1978, aged 92.

== Contribution to Law ==
Geoffrey Cheshire's obituary in The Times described him as "the first academic lawyer to tackle the great reforms in the law of property associated with the name of Lord Birkenhead", and his first book, Modern Law of Real Property, published initially in 1925, became the standard text on the subject. This work has remained in print ever since and, updated by Burn and Cartwright, is now in its 17th edition. (Modern Law of Real Property, E.H. Burn & J.H.Cartwright, O.U.P. 18th Ed. 2011). Generations of students have also studied "The Law of Contract", first written in conjunction with the legal historian C. H. S. Fifoot in 1945, and in its 15th Edition (Law of Contract, Cheshire, Fifoot and Furmston, O.U.P., 17th Ed. 2017).

== Works ==
- Geoffrey Chevalier Cheshire (1925). The Modern Law of Real Property. Butterworth and Company.
- Geoffrey G. Chevalier (1935). Cheshire, Private International Law. Clarendon Press.
- Geoffrey Chevalier Cheshire; C.H.S. Fifoot (1946). The Law of Contract. Butterworth & CŒ.
- Geoffrey Chevalier Cheshire (1964). The English Private Internationale Law of Husband and Wife. Sijthoff.

Academic offices
Preceded by William Searle Holdsworth	Vinerian Professor of English Law; 1944—1949	Succeeded by Harold Hanbury
