= Nancy Robertson (WRNS officer) =

Royal Navy officer

Commandant Dame Nancy Robertson DBE
- Born: Nancy Margaret Robertson; 1 March 1909
- Died: 26 December 2000 (aged 91)
- Military career
- Allegiance: United Kingdom
- Branch: Women's Royal Naval Service
- Service years: 1939–1958
- Rank: Commandant
- Commands: Women's Royal Naval Service (1954–58)
- Conflicts: Second World War
- Awards: Dame Commander of the Order of the British Empire

Commandant Dame Nancy Margaret Robertson, DBE (1 March 1909 – 26 December 2000) was a senior British naval officer who served as Director of the Women's Royal Naval Service from 1954 to 1958.

== Early life ==
Robertson was born on 1 March 1909 to The Revd William Cowper Robertson and his wife Jessie Katharine Robertson (née McGregor). She was educated at Esdaile School in Edinburgh. From 1928 to 1939, having left school, she worked as a secretary in Paris and London.

== Naval career ==
In 1939, Robertson joined the Women's Royal Naval Service (WRNS). During the Second World War, she served as a chief officer (equivalent in rank to commander) at the headquarters of the Commander-in-Chief, Western Approaches in Liverpool, England, and also on the staff of the Flag Officer Ceylon. In the 1946 King's Birthday Honours, Robertson was appointed an Officer of the Order of the British Empire.

After the war, Robertson served as the senior WRNS officer at Royal Naval Dockyard Rosyth, and the Assistant Director of WRNS with responsibility for welfare. Having been promoted to superintendent (equivalent to captain), she served as Superintendent (Air) and Superintendent (Training) and, in the 1953 Coronation Honours, was advanced to Commander of the Order of the British Empire.

In 1954, she was appointed Director of the Women's Royal Naval Service and promoted to commandant (equivalent to commodore). Appointed a Dame Commander of the Order of the British Empire in the 1957 New Year Honours, she retired from the military in 1958.

Military offices
| Preceded by Mary Lloyd | Director of the Women's Royal Naval Service; 1954–1958 | Succeeded by Elizabeth Hoyer-Millar |
