= Lack of Moral Fibre =

Punitive designation used by the Royal Air Force during the Second World War

Lack of Moral Fibre or LMF was a punitive designation used by the Royal Air Force during the Second World War to stigmatize aircrew who refused to fly operations.

By early 1940, RAF commanders were concerned about mounting psychological casualties in Bomber Command and Coastal Command. A letter circulated to commands on 22 April 1940 recommended that squadron commanders identify men who had forfeited their confidence, distinguishing medical cases from those "lacking moral fibre". By the summer of 1940, senior commanders became concerned that medical officers were removing too many men from flying duty. More detailed guidance was given in the Memorandum on the Disposal of Members of Air Crews Who Forfeit the Confidence of Their Commanding Officers S.61141/S.7.C(1) issued on 28 September 1940, signed by Charles Evans, Principal Assistant Secretary for Personnel in the Air Ministry. This "LMF memorandum" was revised on 19 September 1941, 3 February 1943 and 1 March 1945.

Under this procedure, aircrew refusing to fly operations were to be classified as (i) medically fit, (ii) medically unfit on nervous grounds (introduced in the 1941 revision) or (iii) medically unfit for other reasons. Aircrew would not be placed in the first two categories if they had been subject to "exceptional flying stress", and to be assigned to category (i), they "had to be proved to be lacking in moral fibre". From February 1943, aircrew on their second tour (30 operations in Bomber Command) could not be classified LMF, though commanders were urged not to publicize this provision. According to Wing Commander James Lawson, the Air Ministry officer who handled all cases under the Memorandum, 746 officers and 3,313 non-commissioned officers were referred. Of these, 2,726 cases (including 2,337 NCOs) were classified as LMF.

A man classified in categories (i) or (ii) would lose his flying badge, "to prevent his getting a lucrative job as a pilot in civil life". The service records of those classified LMF were stamped with large red "W" (for "waverer"). Officers would lose their commissions and be refused ground jobs in the RAF, while NCOs would be reduced to aircraftman second class and assigned menial tasks, such as latrine duty, for at least three months. From 1944, men released as LMF could be called for the coal mines or drafted into the army.

Contemporary opinion of the system was divided. Though severe, it was less harsh than a court martial. Senior commanders such as Air Vice-Marshals Keith Park (11 Group) and Arthur Harris (5 Group and later Bomber Command) considered it essential. Squadron commanders such as Leonard Cheshire viewed it as justified in a desperate situation. RAF psychiatrists, while acknowledging the deterrent effect, considered it harsh and deficient in failing to take account of individual situations. Many Commonwealth countries resented the application of this procedure to their personnel scattered throughout the RAF. Canadian Air-Vice Marshal Harold Edwards was particularly critical.

As the end of the war approached, the LMF procedure became politically sensitive, and was officially dropped in 1945. However, the term remained in popular use in the RAF until the 1960s. Veterans continue to discuss lack of moral fibre as part of a victim narrative.
