= Leonard Cheshire Disability =

British charitable organization

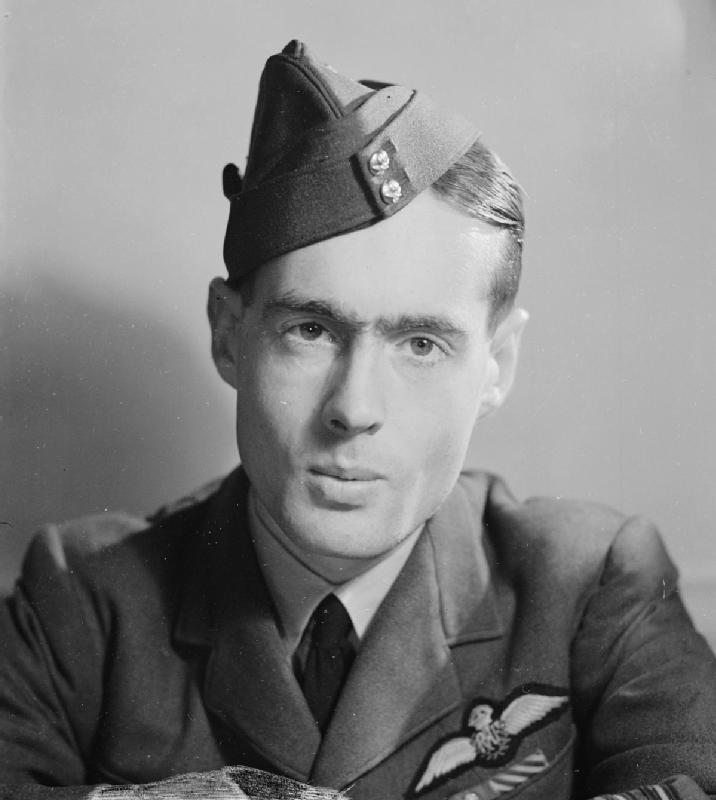
Group Captain Geoffrey Leonard Cheshire, Baron Cheshire, VC, OM, DSO and Two Bars, DFC, founder of the charity

Leonard Cheshire is a major health and welfare charity working in the United Kingdom. It was founded in 1948 by Royal Air Force officer Group Captain Leonard Cheshire VC.

Leonard Cheshire's aims are to support disabled people to live, learn and work as independently as they choose - whatever their ability. The charity provide specialist support to disabled people including those who have extremely complex care needs. It runs residential, nursing and supportive living services as well as offering employment programmes for young disabled people. It also runs political campaigns on issues affecting disabled people.

In 2013–14 it had income of over £162 million, placing it in the top 40 of UK charities. Around 90% of this income came from government grants, and around £18 million in donations (2013/14).

== History ==
The charity was originally known as The Cheshire Foundation Homes for the Sick, and in 1976 became the Leonard Cheshire Foundation. In 2007 it rebranded to Leonard Cheshire Disability and in 2018 its brand and logotype were simplified to Leonard Cheshire.

Group Captain Leonard Cheshire started the charity in 1948 when he took a dying man, who had nowhere else to go, into his own home: a country house called Le Court, near Liss in Hampshire. By the summer of 1949, Le Court had 24 residents with complex needs, illnesses and impairments, living under the 'self-help' philosophy encouraged by Cheshire. As awareness of Leonard's work spread he started to receive referrals from the NHS, and local communities rallied to his cause, building homes for disabled people living in their own local area. By 1955 there were six Cheshire homes in Britain. The first overseas Cheshire Home was established in Mumbai, India the same year.

During the 1960s, this pattern expanded rapidly across the UK. People were inspired by Group Captain Cheshire's example; The Duke of Edinburgh described the work 'as one of the greatest acts of humanity in our time'. Each of these "Cheshire Homes", as they came to be called, were similarly set up: local communities came forward, assembled a group of volunteers, found whatever suitable accommodation they could set up administrative committees and began raising funds for development. This gave each Cheshire Home a local structure closely knit to the community they were serving while being affiliated with an international organization. The founder and his small secretariat in London helped the committees with their endeavours, including arranging well-publicised openings, all the more attractive to the public for Group Captain Cheshire's attendance.

In the 1960s, attitudes towards disabled people were openly discriminatory. Thousands of people with disabilities, often young, were consigned to geriatric hospital wards and employment prospects were non-existent. The charity's aim was to tackle these barriers to disabled people participating fully in society. Residents at Le Court benefited from a greater degree of 'self-help' but the home was still run locally along medical lines by the Warden and Matron. Matters came to a head in 1962 when a group of residents protested against rules curtailing their activities introduced by the Matron. Led by activists (and Le Court residents) Paul Hunt and Peter Wade, supported by the founder and sympathetic staff and trustees, the residents eventually prevailed. This led to changes in the philosophy of the management committee at Le Court and other Cheshire Homes, and eventually to the formation of the Union of the Physically Impaired Against Segregation as Hunt, Wade and others started to explore and campaign for life beyond residential care.

By 1969 there were 50 Leonard Cheshire services in the UK, 15 in India, and Homes in 20 other countries including Portugal, Morocco, Chile, Israel, Nigeria and Sierra Leone. The 1960s produced much new thinking on disability and resulted in better training for residential care workers, personal counselling within the homes and the involvement of residents in management. The first-day centre was established near Nottingham, bungalows for married residents were started in West Sussex and supported living flats were built in Tulse Hill in partnership with the Greater London Council.

Change continued in the 1970s under the foundation's first International Director, Ronald Travers. He established the Leonard Cheshire Foundation International in 1978 and fostered support for the idea of Cheshire homes in America, China and Russia. He led modernisation of attitudes in the UK homes and the transition from expatriate to local community management of the international homes, which became independent charities in their own right, affiliated under a Global Alliance.

By 1992 there were 270 homes in 49 countries, and the transition was made from local management committees to a centralised structure under a Director of Operations, fuelled by changes in social services, legislation and the expectations of service users. The employment in 1999 of the foundation's first Head of Policy, disability campaigner John Knight, saw the charity start to become a campaigning organisation, a significant change in direction. Leonard Cheshire was also one of the first UK charities to introduce a professional volunteer support team. In 1997, disability activist Clare Evans became Leonard Cheshire's first head of Service User Support and established the Service Users Networking Association in 1998.

In 2010, Leonard Cheshire launched their Young Voices website and programme that supported disabled children around the world to campaign for access and their human rights. The children from the programme started a Tumblr blog detailing their work. Members of Young Voices have gone on to run as candidates in their country's elections and have received Queen's Young Leaders Awards from Her Majesty Queen Elizabeth II in 2015.

From 2009 to 2011 it ran the Ability International Media Awards, recognising disabled people in the media.

Leonard Cheshire launched the 'Make Care Fair' campaign in 2013, calling on councils to stop 15-minute care visits, as advised by the Care Act 2014 and NICE Guidelines. In 2016 it reported that 52 out of 152 councils in England ended 15-minute care visits, but that 33,305 people in England still received them. In 2017, Leonard Cheshire's research revealed that 50,677 people across England, Scotland and Wales still received 15-minute care visits.

In 2016, it was announced that 18 care homes owned by Leonard Cheshire would be put up for sale, including homes in Leeds, Sheffield, Calderdale, and York, Wolverhampton, Derbyshire, Oxford and Lincolnshire. In a statement, they said 'A small minority of our properties are not in the right places with easy access to community amenities and with scope to grow. Other providers are better placed to make long-term investments.' All of the services were purchased by Valorum Care, which are based in Leeds, in 2019.

In the financial year 2017/2018, Leonard Cheshire's income grew by over £14m, from £10.9m the year before to £25.1m. Sally Davis, the charity's chair, said that the charity 'continued to face a challenging financial environment' but its income nevertheless grew 'thanks mainly to a significant donation.' This was thought to be a legacy.

In response to the COVID-19 pandemic in 2020, they, as part of The Disability Benefits Consortium (DBC), wrote an open letter to Thérèse Coffey, Secretary of State for Work and Pensions to call for urgent changes to the benefits system to protect disabled and seriously unwell people from further physical and financial harm during the COVID-19 emergency.

In August 2020, whilst Leonard Cheshire was carrying out a redundancy programme, it was reported to the i newspaper that Leonard Cheshire and Scope were planning a merger. A spokesperson for Leonard Cheshire denied that they were discussing a merger at that time.

In March 2022 due to financial pressures, the charity began a redundancy process for job roles outside of its front line care and supported living services. The charity made 300 redundancies but reported it still struggled to recruit front line staff. In April 2022, a serious incident was made by the charity to the Charity Commission for England and Wales, due to the serious financial challenges faced by the organization.

Further measures to improve the charity's financial position included additional redundancies, care home closures and sales of services to other providers. In 2024, the charity reported its first financial surplus for six years. Its expenditure fell by more than £10m to £150m in the year to March 2024, while its income dipped to £152m. Further cuts and sales were planned in 2024/25, as the charity sought to build further reserves and funds for investment.

== International work (1953–2023) ==
As well as supporting the Leonard Cheshire Global Alliance, the charity has run programmes in countries outside the UK since its inception. On 4 July 1969, the first international Cheshire conference officially adopted 'The Singapore Declaration', the first attempt to define the nature of Cheshire organisations across the world. The first international project was a Self Reliance programme, which covered various costs including grants for vehicles, building costs and the further development of new organisations.

From 1988, the international secretariat ran an International Training and Development programme which supported Cheshire organisations through training initiatives for care staff and managers.

As thinking around disability started to change, the adoption of the UN Convention on the Rights of Persons with Disabilities (UNCRPD) at the United Nations in 2006 led to different funding availability and a new approach. In response, the international directorate moved from being a secretariat for a network of organisations to a provider of programmes for disabled people globally.

In 2018, a database of disability statistics called the Disability Data Portal was launched for people with disabilities to use to monitor and demand changes within their country of residence.

As part of a call for new trustees in late 2022, Leonard Cheshire announced plans for a significant scaling back and a review of the make-up and direction of its social care services. International work was not mentioned as part of their new 'smaller' organisation. In 2023 it was confirmed in their annual report that they had stopped all international work and the department was closed.

== Related organisations ==
The Ryder-Cheshire Mission was set up by Leonard Cheshire and his wife Sue Ryder at the time of their marriage in 1959 and later became the Ryder-Cheshire Foundation which operated until 2010. Other related former charities include Target Tuberculosis, operating in India and certain countries of Africa (2003–2016).

The rehabilitation of disabled people was supported through Ryder-Cheshire Volunteers, founded in 1986, which is now the Enrych charity.

The Leonard Cheshire Disability & Inclusive Development Centre is a joint project by Leonard Cheshire Disability and University College London (originally set up in 1997 as the Leonard Cheshire Centre of Conflict Recovery). The centre is dedicated to generating applied research on disability in development, with particular emphasis on poverty and economic development in terms of livelihoods, inclusive education and public health. Centre staff also work closely on policy issues at a global level, serving in an advisory capacity to a number of UN agencies (including UNDESA, UNICEF, ILO, World Bank) and bilateral organisations (including DFID, Department of Foreign Affairs and Trade (Australia)). The centre is based in the Department of Epidemiology and Public Health, University College London.

Cheshire founded the Raphael Pilgrimage to support sick and disabled people to travel to Lourdes.

Sue Ryder Care, a charity founded in 1953 by Sue Ryder, before she met Leonard Cheshire, was one of the 50 largest charities in the UK in 2008.

== Web domain name legal case ==
In 2001, Paul Darke resigned from the role of national advocacy officer and from the public affairs committee and bought the domain name www.leonard-cheshire.com to highlight the charity's role in institutionalising those with disabilities and neglecting those in their care.

He stated that 'the main reason you cease to be a Leonard Cheshire service user is death' and that charity donations would pay for 'private medical insurance of senior directors and management get-togethers costing £10,000 a weekend'. After a heated debate on BBC Radio 4, as well as 50,000 hits on the website, Leonard Cheshire submitted a complaint to the World Intellectual Property Organization. WIPO ruled that Darke has no right or legitimate interest in the domain name; and that it has been registered and used by him in bad faith.

The charity rebranded to Leonard Cheshire Disability in 2007, and the domain name is unused as of September 2020. The case has been cited in a law textbook.

== Notable people ==
- Group Captain Lord Leonard Cheshire, WWII RAF Group Captain, humanitarian and founder of Leonard Cheshire
- Lord Justice Alfred Denning, lawyer and judge, first chairman of Leonard Cheshire 1952–1961
- Geoffrey Chevalier Cheshire, barrister, law academic and father of Group Captain Cheshire, second chairman 1961–1964
- Edmund Davies, judge and Law Lord, third chairman 1964–1974
- Ronald Travers, BBC producer and volunteer at Le Court (1956) became Group Captain Cheshire's personal assistant in 1969, setting up the Counselling Service, an early form of Quality Assurance and Safeguarding (before the CQC inspection of social care services began in 2003) and the first International Director in 1979 until his retirement in 1998
- Air Chief Marshal Sir Christopher Foxley-Norris, WWII fighter pilot and senior RAF commander, fourth Chairman 1974–1982
- Arthur Bennett, an RAF pilot, was disabled after a flying accident that resulted in severe burns, first chief executive officer (CEO) from 1979 until his retirement in 1991
- General Sir Geoffrey Howlett, former Commander in Chief of Allied Forces Northern Europe, sixth chairman 1990–1995
- Diplomat Sir David Goodall, seventh chairman 1995–2000
- Banker Charles Morland, eighth chairman 2000–2005 and the first disabled chairman of the charity
- Diplomat Sir Nigel Broomfield, ninth chairman 2005–2009
- Technologist Ilyas Khan, tenth chairman 2009–2015
- Bryan Dutton, Director-General 1998–2008
- John Knight, disability rights campaigner and public policy analyst, Leonard Cheshire's first Head of Policy in 1999
- Clare Evans, disability campaigner and Leonard Cheshire's first national Head of Service User Support 1997–2010
- Neil Heslop, founder of Blind in Business, the second disabled CEO of Leonard Cheshire from 2017 to 2020
- David Grayson CBE, twelfth chairman (and second chairman to have a disability), appointed 2021–2023; former chair of the National Disability Council

== See also ==
- Cheshire Home, Chung Hom Kok
- Blesma, The Limbless Veterans, charity supporting disabled ex-service men and women
