= Leonard Cheshire =

Royal Air Force officer (1917–1992)

Servant of God Group Captain The Right Honourable The Lord Cheshire VC, OM, DSO & Two Bars, DFC
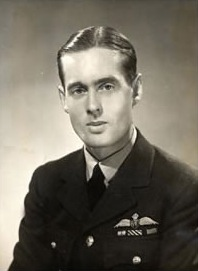
- Wing Commander Leonard Cheshire in January 1943
- Born: 7 September 1917; Chester, England
- Died: 31 July 1992 (aged 74); Cavendish, Suffolk, England
- Burial place: Cavendish Cemetery
- Spouse(s): Constance Binney (m. 1941; div. 1951) Sue Ryder (m. 1959)
- Children: 2
- Relatives: Geoffrey Chevalier Cheshire (father)
- Military career
- Allegiance: United Kingdom
- Branch: Royal Air Force
- Service years: 1937–1946
- Rank: Group captain
- Service number: 72021
- Units: No. 102 Squadron RAF; No. 35 Squadron RAF
- Commands: No. 617 Squadron RAF (1943–44); RAF Marston Moor (1943); No. 76 Squadron RAF (1942–43)
- Conflicts: Second World War
- Awards: Victoria Cross; Member of the Order of Merit; Distinguished Service Order & Two Bars; Distinguished Flying Cross; Mentioned in Despatches
- Other work: Humanitarian

Geoffrey Leonard Cheshire, Baron Cheshire, VC, OM, DSO & Two Bars, DFC (7 September 1917 – 31 July 1992) was a British Royal Air Force pilot, officer and philanthropist.

Cheshire fought in the Second World War. Among the decorations Cheshire received as a pilot was the Victoria Cross, the highest award for gallantry in the face of the enemy that can be awarded to British and Commonwealth forces. He was the youngest group captain in the Royal Air Force (RAF) and one of the most highly decorated pilots of the war.

After the war he founded a nursing home that grew into the charity Leonard Cheshire Disability. He became known for his work in conflict resolution. In 1991 he was created a life peer in recognition of his charitable work. He is under consideration for beatification in the Roman Catholic Church.

== Early life ==
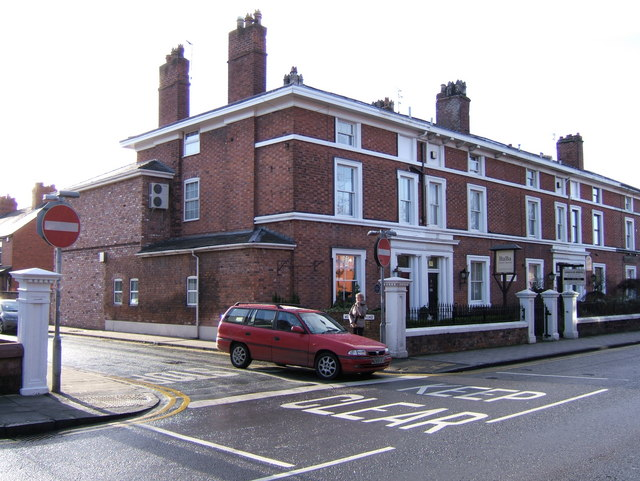
A blue plaque marks the house in which he was born in Chester, which at the time was a nursing home for expectant mothers.

Geoffrey Leonard Cheshire, known as Leonard, was the son of Geoffrey Chevalier Cheshire, a barrister, academic and influential writer on English law. His mother, Primrose Barstow, was from a Scottish Army family and named Leonard after her brother, who died fighting in Kūt in early 1917. Leonard had one younger brother, Christopher Cheshire, also a wartime bomber pilot. Cheshire was born in Hoole, Chester, where his paternal grandparents lived, but was brought up at his parents' home near Oxford. Cheshire was educated at the Dragon School in Oxford, Stowe School and Merton College, Oxford.

At Stowe he was taught English by the writer T. H. White, but he was adamant in later years that he never flew with him. At school, Leonard excelled at lawn tennis, becoming Captain and showed an aptitude for languages and an interest in reading and natural history. At the end of his final Easter term 1936, his father arranged for him a stay in Germany with the family of Ludwig von Reuter in Potsdam and while there, witnessed an Adolf Hitler rally. Cheshire caused considerable offence by pointedly refusing to give the Nazi salute. Most of his time was spent with von Reuter's three sons, cycling, swimming and visiting Berlin and other cities. An early love of motorcar racing was fostered by trips to the Nürburgring and he entered a local tennis tournament, which he nearly won.

He entered Merton College at the University of Oxford in 1936 and joined Oxford University Air Squadron the following month. His closest university friends were Jack Randle and Peter Higgs who both followed him into war; Jack was awarded the VC posthumously in 1944 for bravery in the Battle of Kohima that year, and Peter was the first RAF fighter pilot to be lost in combat during the Battle of Britain.

At university he became a typical student of the time, taking part in pranks and displaying a knack for getting himself in the newspapers, or "creating a sensation" as Leonard called it. On one occasion at Oxford he was bet half a pint of beer with landlord of the Chequers pub Jig Holloway, that he could not walk to Paris with no more than a few pennies in his pocket; he won his bet – getting to Paris on foot by doing odd jobs and hitchhiking, eventually giving a press conference on arrival and earning enough money to travel back in first class. A local newspaper headline "Undergraduate Astonished that His Car Could Do 40 m.p.h." was the result of a speeding charge earned in Peter Higgs' car, which in mitigation Cheshire had said was over 2 years old and never known to go above 30. Leonard later said his aims at Oxford were to "drive a Bentley, dress in a Savile Row suit, in short to make pots of money without too many scruples how" yet he had no clear idea how to make money, apart from cultivating celebrity. Fred Astaire was an inspiration; Leonard even took tap dancing lessons in the hope of emulating him and modelled his hair and habit of using a cigarette holder on The Saint. As a young man, his friends later described him as having a personality of many layers, self-sufficient yet full of nervous energy.

Academically he was thought intelligent but not wildly keen on his subject, jurisprudence. His tutor F. H. Lawson said he "kept up quite well ... He wasn't the pure intellectual type. I was always satisfied with his work because he was 'a trier' – without breaking his neck". During his university years, Cheshire was required to participate in one of the service clubs. He chose the cavalry, but soon found the early hours and physical demands were not to his liking, and he transferred to the Oxford University Air Squadron because it involved sitting down. There he learned his basic piloting skills. Cheshire graduated in 1939 with a second-class degree.

== Military career ==
=== Early training ===
On 16 November 1937 Cheshire received his commission as a pilot officer in the Royal Air Force Volunteer Reserve. He joined as a way to get out of his university finals, but his father soon put his foot down and insisted he sit them, then apply for a permanent commission under the RAF's direct entry scheme. On 7 October 1939 he received his permanent commission with the RAF. In selecting his preference Cheshire listed 1) Fighter Command 2) Light Bomber Force and 3) Army Cooperation force. To his disappointment, he was assigned to Bomber Command, and sent for training at RAF Hullavington, and then to RAF Abingdon. It was here that his career in the RAF was nearly ended before it even got started. Cheshire made a loud joking remark at a pub about German troops having arrived in England, which was reported. He was called in to the station commander, and was nearly sent to the infantry, but he apologised and was kept in.

=== 102 Squadron ===
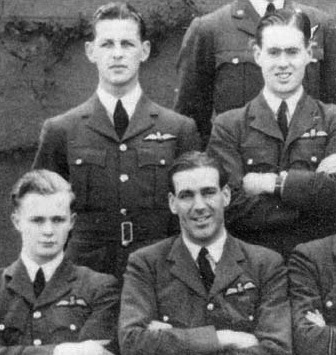
Hugh "Lofty" Long (centre) with pilot officer Cheshire (second row, right) in group photo of 102 Squadron, 1940

On 7 April 1940 Cheshire was promoted to flying officer and in June he was posted to 102 Squadron, flying the Armstrong Whitworth Whitley. 102 Squadron was in 4 Group of Bomber Command, and shared the airfield at RAF Driffield with 77 Squadron. Cheshire remarked that upon arriving at Driffield he was filled with a fear that he would not measure up to what was expected of him, but soon found himself buoyed with the sense of being part of a tradition. He became good friends with a number of pilots there, including Hugh "Lofty" Long and Jimmy Marks.

As a new pilot at Driffield, Cheshire was placed under the tutelage of Long. Cheshire found Long both demanding and encouraging. From the outset Long tested Cheshire on every aspect of the aircraft. He expected Cheshire to know the aircraft inside and out. His goal was to make flying the aircraft so second nature, that when the point of critical action arrived all of Cheshire's attention could be focused on the problem, as none of his concentration would be diverted by the task of flying. Long made Cheshire spend every spare minute he had learning the machine. "Lofty kept drumming into my head the fundamental lesson of never thinking that you have mastered your job, of applying your whole heart and mind to the task of perfecting as far as is humanly possible the techniques of operational flying. He made me practice and re-practice, study and re-study, experiment and re-experiment. I had to sit in the cockpit blindfold and go through the different drills, sit in the rear turret, in the navigator's and the wireless operator's seat, and try and see life from their point of view."

Long knew every man supporting the aircraft, both in his flight crew and his ground crew, and the concerns and hardships each man faced. Long took Cheshire along when he spoke to his men, and impressed upon him the importance of the commander being aware of their concerns. Cheshire credited him for making him a good captain. Thinking back upon those days, Cheshire noted "I do not think there could have been a single piece of equipment or a single aspect of flying on which he failed to question me... There was the ground crew also, to each of whom Lofty introduced me individually, talking of their problems, and the background from which they came and explaining the importance of building up a personal relationship with them."

Cheshire's first ten missions were flown as second pilot to Long. On those early missions Long placed Cheshire in the pilot's seat early and often, giving Cheshire invaluable experience of flying through flak over a target. By June Cheshire was commanding his own aircraft.

==== Distinguished Service Order (DSO) mission ====
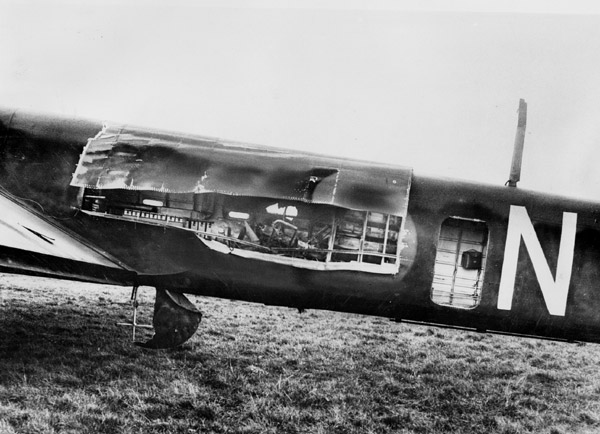
Cheshire's fire-damaged Whitley bomber, November 1940

In the spring of 1940 Bomber Command began its campaign against German industry. On the night of 12/13 November 1940, Cheshire was briefed to attack the synthetic oil plant at Wesseling, near Cologne. While en route Cheshire found the target was obscured by bad weather, so decided to attack the railway yards at Cologne instead. Initially in his bombing run there was little flak, but suddenly two anti-aircraft rounds exploded near the aircraft. The two anti-aircraft shells had exploded almost simultaneously near the plane, one right above the cockpit, and the other just under the port wing. The flash from the first blinded Cheshire, and the second rent a huge tear in the fuselage, igniting one of the aircraft's flares. The aircraft was falling in a steep dive. Cheshire regained his senses and realised both engines were still working, and pulled the aircraft out at about 5,000 feet. The crew were able to extinguish the fire, though they had to take precautions not to fall out. By the time they did they realised they were flying deeper into Germany. Realizing he still had a functioning aircraft with a bomb load, Cheshire brought the aircraft around and returned to make another bomb run on the target. Arriving over Cologne he now was the sole bomber over the target and faced the concentrated flak of the city's defenders. Nevertheless, he made it to the marshalling yard, dropped his bomb load and managed to get the aircraft and crew safely back to base at RAF Linton-on-Ouse, Yorkshire. For bombing the yard in a badly damaged aircraft and still managing to get it back to England he was awarded the Distinguished Service Order.

Completing his first tour of operations in January 1941, Cheshire immediately volunteered for a second tour.

=== 35 Squadron ===
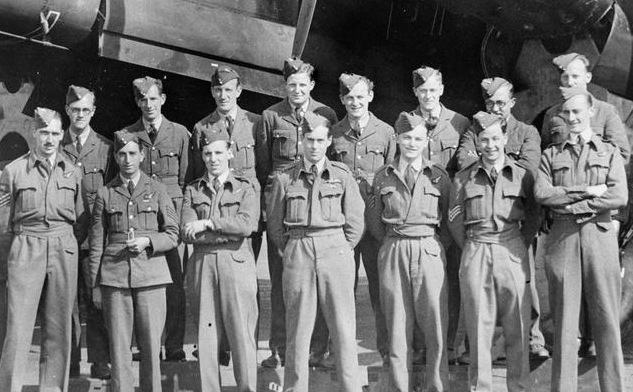
Cheshire with air crew and ground crew while at 35 Squadron

Cheshire was posted to 35 Squadron in January 1941, where he joined Jimmy Marks, "Willie" Tait and George Holden. The squadron was converting to the new four-engine heavy bomber, the Handley Page Halifax. His time in 35 Squadron included seven raids on Berlin. Cheshire was promoted to acting squadron leader on 1 March 1941, and was awarded the Distinguished Flying Cross (DFC) later that same month. Losses among Bomber Command continued. Four months after Cheshire completed his DSO mission, "Lofty" Long was killed during a mission on 13 March 1941. It was another close personal loss for Cheshire. "Whatever outward face I may have put on it, his loss affected me very deeply, and the memory of what I owed him and of all that he stood for remained with me throughout the war."

On 7 April 1941 he was promoted to flight lieutenant, and became commander of a flight.

==== Trip to North America ====
At the start of May, 35 Squadron's Halifaxes were stood down to undergo modifications to address design flaws. Cheshire obtained a posting to the Atlantic Ferry Organisation to fly a Liberator across the Atlantic. On 4 May 1941 Cheshire reported aboard a Norwegian steamer to begin his trip across the Atlantic. The convoy was not intercepted by the German capital ships, but did suffer multiple attacks from German U-boats, and a number of ships were lost. Cheshire came through unscathed.

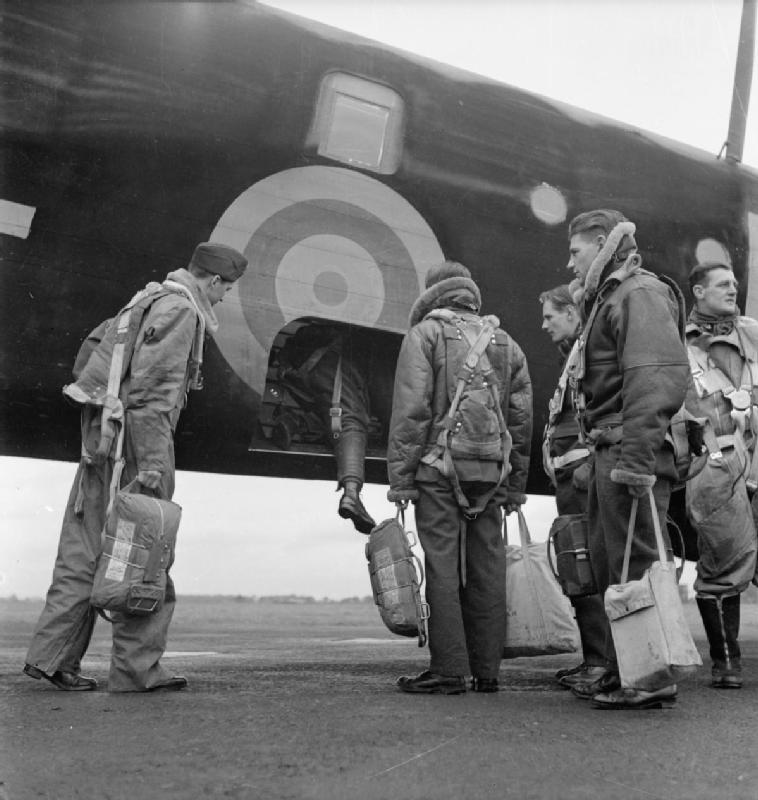
35 Squadron Halifax crew climbs aboard in preparation for a mission over the continent

Cheshire finally arrived in Canada to find the authorities there did not know who he was or what he was there for. He had expected to fly a Liberator or Canadian-built Halifax back to England but he was not allowed to, as he did not have experience in navigation. He and his companion RAF officer decided to take a short trip to New York while things were sorted out. While there he met former stage actress Constance Binney, who was twenty years older. In three weeks the two were married. Jimmy Marks was to witness the wedding, but was required to take an aircraft back to England before the wedding, so Cheshire and his bride had to use strangers as their witnesses. After a three-week wait he was finally allowed to shuttle a Hudson back to England. When he returned he was met by a single crewman, and learned that all the others from his Whitley had been lost on missions over Germany. It was a hard blow to Cheshire.

After his return, Cheshire resumed flying the Halifax in missions over Germany. He completed his second tour early in 1942. By the end of his time at 35 Squadron Cheshire had completed 50 sorties.

=== Flight instructor ===
After completing his tour at 35 Squadron, Cheshire was posted to a Heavy Conversion Unit (HCU) at RAF Marston Moor in North Yorkshire. Though in a training unit, he still flew operations when the training units were called upon to join the main force for maximum effort missions. The new commander in chief of Bomber Command, Arthur Harris, had taken over in February 1942. He was a firm believer that bombing German production was a war-winning strategy. The bombing campaign thus far had not been effective, and Harris was trying to hold his force together against competing interests from the other services who had designs on his aeroplanes. At the time he assumed command the bomber force was limited to about 400 aircraft, most of these being two-engine Whitleys and Wellingtons. To demonstrate what could be accomplished, he planned to conduct several thousand-plane raids. The first of these was against Cologne on the night of 30/31 May 1942. Scraping together every aircraft he could, including the training units, he was able to get a thousand aircraft in the air. Cheshire was a part of the force. He twice flew on thousand-plane raids while serving as an instructor pilot. While completing his time as a pilot trainer, his younger brother Christopher, flying a Halifax for 76 Squadron, was shot down over Berlin on the night of 8/9 August 1942. Cheshire had flown that mission as well. When he returned from Berlin he learned that his brother had not.

=== 76 Squadron ===
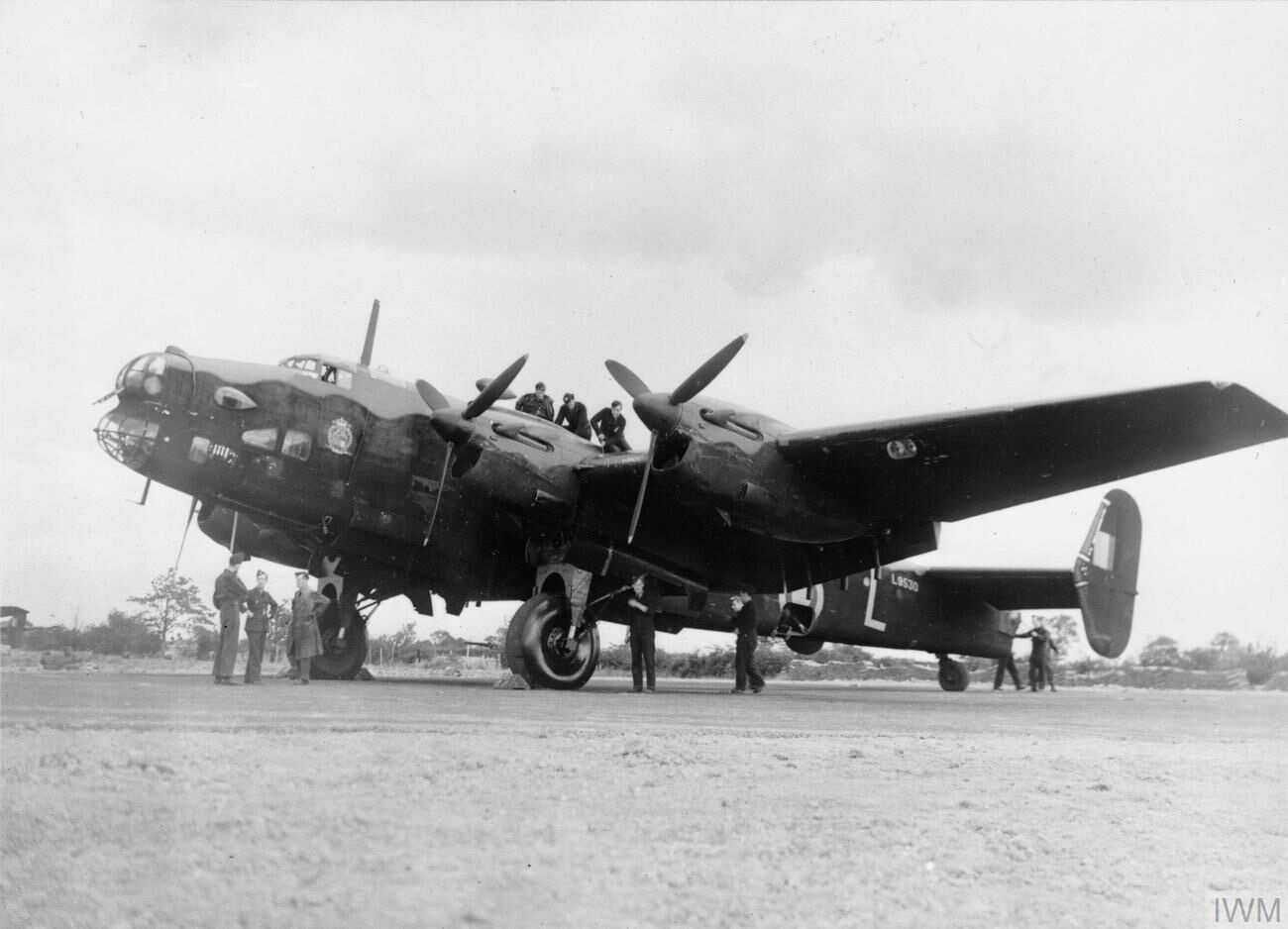
76 Squadron Halifax on the tarmac

In August 1942 Cheshire was promoted to acting wing commander and assigned as commanding officer of No. 76 Squadron RAF, stationed at RAF Linton-on-Ouse. The squadron was flying the Halifax bomber, and was reforming, having suffered heavy losses and low morale. Cheshire and three crews that transferred in from 102 Squadron made up the core of the unit. The crews billeted at Beningbrough Hall.

As commanding officer, Cheshire was only to fly operations once a month unless absolutely necessary. Cheshire found it absolutely necessary several times a month. He always flew on the most dangerous operations, and never took the less dangerous ops to France. As commanding officer Cheshire had no crew of his own. When he flew along with novice crews he went along as "second pilot" to give them confidence. With more experienced crews he took the pilot's seat, and moved the crew's regular pilot to the second pilot spot. On one occasion 76 Squadron was ordered to Nuremberg, and were to cross the French coast at 2,000 ft. This was a very dangerous height for light flak, and Cheshire simply refused. With typical Cheshire obstinacy, he stated they would fly at 200 ft or 20,000 ft.

Cheshire tackled the morale problem by ordering changes to the aircraft to improve the performance. He was among the first to notice that it was very rare for a Halifax to return on three engines. There were reports the Halifax was unstable in a "corkscrew", the manoeuvre used by bomber pilots to escape the attacks of night fighters. Test pilot, Captain Eric Brown, was tasked with determining the cause. He and his flight engineer set to conduct a series of flight tests, when Brown was informed a representative from Bomber Command would fly along. Brown remembers "We couldn't believe it, it was Cheshire! We were astonished to say the least. I asked him not to touch the controls, and to his everlasting credit he never commented at all. He just sat in the second pilot's seat and raised his eyebrows at what we were doing!"

A part of the problem was that the Halifax could not fly as high as the Lancaster, and so was subject to greater attention from flak and night fighters. To lighten the aircraft, Cheshire had the exhaust covers and part of the mid-upper and nose gun turrets removed. This allowed the bombers to fly higher and faster. Losses soon fell, and morale rose accordingly.

During his time as the commanding officer of 76 Squadron Cheshire took the trouble to recognise and learn the names of every single man on the base. This was a reflection on Long, the pilot whom he had first trained under at 102 Squadron. Cheshire was determined to increase the efficiency of his squadron and improve the chances of survival of its crews. To this end, he frequently lectured the crews during preflight briefings on the skills needed to stay alive. With a new crew he would fly with them and demonstrate how it was done himself. Speaking of those days, Flight Sergeant Tom Gallantry, DFC, offered the following: "He could do anything, and did. We all knew he wasn't supposed to go on so many operational trips, but he did. He took new crews and gave them the benefit of his experience. He taught them what predicted flak was, he taught them what a box barrage was, by flying through it. That's certainly more than I would have done." With the ground crews he formed "The Plumbers Club" where they could come together and work out problems they were facing. Their motto was "You bend 'em, we mend 'em."

=== Marston Moor ===
With the completion of his third tour Cheshire was officially ineligible for further operational flying. Air Vice-Marshal Roderick Carr, Cheshire's former Group Commander when he was at No. 102 Squadron, put much effort into securing Cheshire a promotion to acting group captain, which the Air Ministry finally approved in March. The promotion made Cheshire, at 25, the youngest group captain in the history of the RAF. On 1 April Cheshire returned to Marston Moor, now as the station commander. The airfield was used by the 1652 Heavy Conversion Unit (HCU) to convert pilots from the two-engine Whitley and Wellington bombers to the four-engined Handley Page Halifax bomber. Cheshire was in charge of 30 to 40 aircraft and 1,800 to 2,000 men.

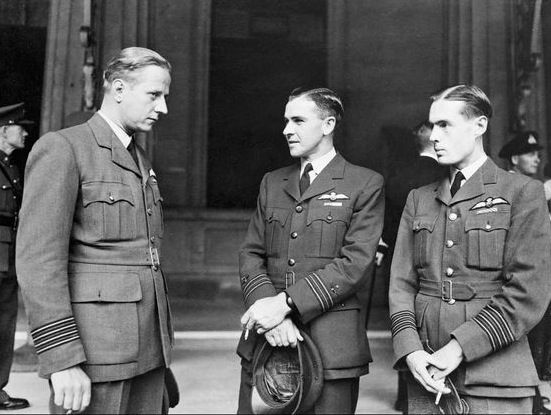
The RAF's Percy Pickard, William Blessing and Leonard Cheshire at their investment ceremony at Buckingham Palace, 28 July 1943. Of the three, only Cheshire survived the war

Cheshire's posting to Marston Moor was not to his liking. He had been an operational pilot his whole career, and he had limited experience in RAF administrative processes. He found himself frustrated at Marston Moor, not least of all by his adjutant, Bob Dales. Said Cheshire "I found myself promoted very rapidly to a position which I had not been trained to fulfill. To begin with, I had great trouble with the station's warrant officer, because he knew King's Regulations backwards and forwards, and he was perpetually quoting it at me, and I had no idea if they were right or wrong, and I just felt out of my depth." Dales countered "Group Captain Leonard Cheshire was the most frustrated senior officer I ever knew. Almost every day he pressed for a return to an operational tour. I believe his father was a barrister, and through his hatch he would try to defeat me on some point of Air Force law, but I was well versed in King's Regulations and Air Ministry Orders."

Cheshire did what he could to convey to the men being trained how what was being taught at the OCU would translate to saving lives once they began flying in earnest. In April he was awarded a bar to his DSO. And yet the time was a personal crisis for Cheshire. He longed to get back to operational flying but could not, as he could not ask Air Vice-Marshal Carr to reverse his promotion to Group Captain, and with such a rank no flying position was available. A possible 'out' arose when the AOC of the PFF, Don Bennett, arrived at his airfield to tour his station. Cheshire approached Bennett and asked permission to transfer to the Pathfinder Force. Bennett was not receptive. He replied that at present no jobs were available. Regardless, he was not sure if Cheshire would be suitable and a trial would be necessary. Cheshire was not pleased, and said so. It is not known why Bennett did not want Cheshire in the Pathfinder Force. It was not the first time Bennett had passed on Cheshire. Bennett's primary recruiting officer, Hamish Mahaddie, found it a mystery. Mahaddie said "Chesh was the only person I selected for training with the Pathfinder Force that Bennett vetoed. I was never able to establish why." In the end Cheshire viewed the refusal as a blessing in disguise. "He did me a good turn, because I got something better."

In 1943, Cheshire published an account of his first tour of operations in his book, Bomber Pilot which tells of his posting to RAF Driffield in East Yorkshire, and the story of flying his badly damaged bomber ("N for Nuts") back to base. It became a national bestseller.

=== 617 Squadron ===
No. 5 Group Commander Ralph Cochrane provided the avenue for Cheshire's escape. Cochrane's elite unit, 617 Squadron, was in difficulty. Guy Gibson had been withdrawn from flying and taken on a publicity tour. He was succeeded by Wing Commander George Holden. Soon thereafter, the squadron attempted the disastrous raid called Operation Garlic against the two Glane culverts in the Dortmund-Ems Canal, which resulted in the loss of five of the eight Lancasters sent, including that of the new squadron commander. Temporary command of the squadron was passed to H. B. "Mick" Martin, one of the squadron's flight commanders. Of the original nineteen pilots that had flown the mission against the Möhne and Edersee Dams in Operation Chastise, only five remained alive. In September Cochrane asked Cheshire if he would be willing to take the job. Returning to squadron commander would require Cheshire giving up his rank of group captain and taking the step down to wing commander. Cheshire agreed without hesitation. Cochrane instructed Cheshire that first off he would need to complete a three-week conversion course on Lancasters at RAF Warboys.

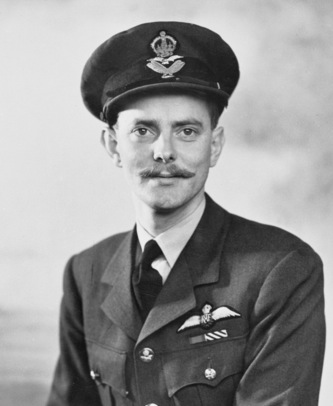
The Australian "Mick" Martin

Cheshire knew the new post would be a challenge for him. Arriving at 617 Squadron he was regarded as an outsider. Though an experienced bomber pilot from the command's campaign against Germany, those missions were flown at high altitude and solo. Hundreds of aircraft were on each raid, but in the dark of night they rarely saw each other. Each plane was in isolation from the others, and flew in strict radio silence. 617 Squadron had become Bomber Command's masters of low flying at night. Low altitude kept them under German radar, allowing them to approach their targets undetected. For months they had been flying together at low level, at night, in formation, and below tree level. They had learned to avoid obstructions, and to tuck their wings inside the leader's, a move that decreased turbulence but was very unnerving to attempt. It was very dangerous flying that no other squadron could perform. Here Cheshire benefited from a friendship that he formed with the man he superseded, confessing later "Everything I know about low-level flying I learned from Mick Martin." As to Cochrane, he had been warned Cochrane was an uncompromising and strict CO, and that they would not get along. However Cheshire found Cochrane to be very bright, and though strict, it was a strictness in the best possible sense. An example of Cochrane's inflexibility arose early on, when Cochrane insisted Cheshire complete the three-week conversion course to Lancasters at Warboys. An experienced pilot on the Halifax, Cheshire felt the training flying demeaning, but after his second day there he realised Cochrane had been quite right.

While serving with 617 Squadron, Cheshire established a reputation as an effective air officer. During this period, he introduced and refined operational methods that improved the Royal Air Force’s ability to deliver large bombs with great accuracy. His leadership and willingness to adopt unconventional tactics played a role in these developments.

==== V-3 mission ====
The mission Cochrane had recruited Cheshire for was the destruction of the German V-3 long-range guns. As their third and potentially most destructive vengeance weapon, the Germans had constructed a pair of extremely large guns and positioned them in northern France. They were buried deep in underground bunkers near Mimoyecques in the Pas-de-Calais region. Once operational these powerful guns would be able to fire a 500 lb (230 kg) shell into London every minute. Buried in the earth and protected by 50 feet of reinforced concrete, they were impervious to a conventional bombing attack. Such a target was very different from a marshalling yard. Area bombing the region where the guns were located would have no effect upon them.

British scientist and inventor Barnes Wallis had been asked to produce a bomb that could destroy these bunkers. The resulting bomb weighed 12,000 pounds, and if dropped from 20,000 feet would penetrate the earth and cause a small scale earthquake, destroying the target. He called this bomb the Tallboy. To be effective the bombs had to be dropped very accurately. He stated that, for accuracy requirements, one bomb out of fifteen dropped from 20,000 feet needed to land within twelve metres of the target. This was an accuracy unheard of in daytime aerial bombing, let alone bombing at night. Cheshire suggested this was going to be a problem, but got no sympathy from Wallis, who replied "Well, if you're going to scatter my bombs all over northern France what's the point of my building them?"

In January the need for a new marking technique became clear to Cheshire when 617 Squadron made an attack against a V-1 site in the Pas de Calais region. A Pathfinder aircraft working at altitude dropped a marker flare upon the target. 617 then proceeded to drop all their bombs within 94 yards of the marker, a remarkable feat of accuracy. The problem was the marker was 350 yards from the target, and the mission was a failure.

In February 1944 Harris called a meeting at High Wycombe to discuss the destruction of the V-3 site. The meeting included the AOC of Bomber Command Arthur Harris, the AOC of the Pathfinder Force, Air Vice-Marshal Bennett and 5 Group AOC Cochrane, who brought along with him Cheshire. It was chaired by deputy air officer commanding-in-chief Robert Saundby. Bennett was informed of the accuracy needed to mark the target. He dismissed the idea, stating that it could not be done. Cheshire offered that it could be achieved if attempted with a low-level marker aircraft. Bennett rejected this as well, stating that a low-level flight against a well-defended target would not be survivable. The problem was withdrawn from the Pathfinders, but was given to 5 Group to see if they could work out a solution. This is what Cochrane was hoping for. The operation could not be undertaken at once, as the large bomb that Barnes Wallis proposed to destroy the target at Mimoyecques was still under development. Cheshire and Martin thus had a small window of time to develop a technique by which they could accurately hit within yards of the target.

The first task to develop was how to mark the target. The Pathfinder technique was to drop a group of markers. A master bomber would then direct the following aircraft to drop their bombs on the markers below, adjusting to the best marker as needed. Cheshire chose to drop a single, very accurate marker, and have the rest of the force bomb that. A barrier existed in that for the sake of air crew safety Cochrane insisted the markers be released at no less than 5,000 feet. Efforts to mark the target from 5,000 feet on the bombing ranges proved frustratingly difficult. Even when the marker was dropped dead on upon the target, the angular momentum of the marker caused it to slide or skip a hundred yards before coming to a rest. At 5,000 feet they never could get closer than 150 to 300 yards from target. Martin tried using a dive-bomb technique, approaching at 5,000 feet and then dropping into a 30-degree dive, releasing the marker at 100 feet before pulling the big Lancaster up. Though the Lancaster was a cumbersome aircraft to attempt it in, the result was accurate.

Cheshire could now mark the target using a method that was not permitted. He next moved on to identifying the target at night. To mark the target, it had to be visible to the marking pilot. For this the area would need to be illuminated. A second aircraft would need to drop an illumination flare before the marking aircraft made its run. Given the release of the illumination flare was timed to the effort to mark the target, the flare could be dropped by parachute from 5,000 feet. To keep the illumination flare over the target area on its descent the weather would have to be fair, with limited wind. Thus the components for precision low-level marking at night came together. With an illuminated target area, he could mark the target with one accurate target indicator flare which the main force could aim for, and thereby destroy the target.

==== Limoges raid ====
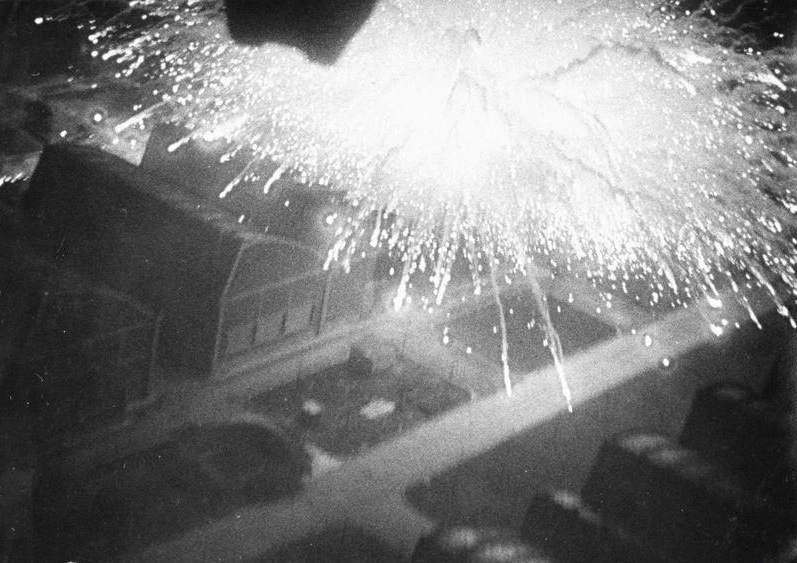
Cheshire drops his marker on the roof of the Gnome et Rhône aero-engine factory at Limoges

Cheshire and Martin discussed their proposed method with Cochrane, who agreed to allow them to try it. The target would be the Gnome et Rhône aero-engine factory at Limoges in France. The air defences would be lighter, but there were two problems with this target. The first was that the factory was surrounded by the homes of the factory's French workers. Secondly, the plant was running around the clock, so French workers would be in the factory when it was attacked at night. As it was a target in France the proposal to bomb it had to be sent to the War Cabinet for approval. The raid was approved, but with the condition that they were forbidden from taking any civilian lives. It would be their one chance to prove low-level marking in combat.

On the night of 8/9 February 1944 the Lancasters of 617 Squadron approached Limoges at 16,000 feet. Below, a Lancaster at 5,000 feet dropped shielded flares over the target. Cheshire and Martin came in at 2,000 feet, and could see as light as day. He identified the roof top of the Gnome-Rhone factory, and proceeded to make a series of low-level passes at 20 feet, hoping the workers inside would take the hint. The 500 workers ran out of the building. Cheshire then dropped a marker flare on the roof top. Approaching at 16,000 feet, the rest of 617 came in one at a time, each aircraft dropping its bomb load directly on the marker. The factory was devastated, and the only civilian casualty was a worker who was injured when she came back to the factory to try to get her bicycle. It was Cheshire's first big success with 617.

==== Anthéor railway viaduct ====
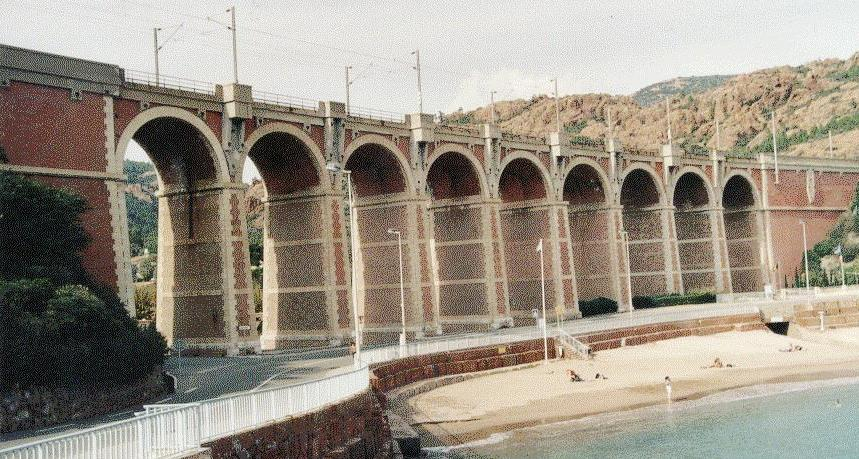
The Anthéor railway viaduct near Saint-Raphaël

The Anthéor viaduct was a railway link in southern France along the coast between Saint-Raphaël and Nice. The viaduct carried a double railway line that was being used to move supplies to German forces blocking the advance of the Allies in Italy. Though the Marseille–Ventimiglia railway had been attacked and cut in a number of places before, each time the Germans repaired the tracks quickly. The viaduct was 185 feet in the air and spanned a brook that flowed between two coastal hills. If destroyed the line would be disrupted permanently. Attempts on the viaduct had been made twice earlier, but destroying it required a direct hit, and the previous attacks had been unsuccessful.

On the night of 12/13 February 1944, 10 Lancasters from 617 Squadron flew across France to the viaduct. Cheshire and Martin approached to make a low-level marking of the line, but it was soon discovered that since the last attempt the Germans had placed a large number of flak guns on the hills overlooking the viaduct. Cheshire made several attempts to mark it, but could not get close enough to drop his marker on the line. Martin followed, but just as his aircraft was releasing his marker it was hit, badly. Two of the Lancaster's engines were knocked out, the bomb aimer had been killed, and several others, including Martin, were wounded. A return trip to England was out of the question, and his aircraft limped south to an airfield on Sardinia. (Note: Martin was at the end of his tour with 617 Squadron, and would not return. After he got back to England and recovered from his injuries he was transferred to 100 Group Headquarters.) Cheshire made five more attempts on the viaduct, but was unable to get close enough to leave his marker on the railway line. The squadron was called in and dropped their bombs off the nearest marker, but no direct hit was made and the viaduct was not destroyed. Cheshire returned in failure with a badly holed Lancaster. Despite his multiple runs at the target and the damage his aircraft sustained, it was the one mission of his career where he felt he had failed to press home his attack as he should have.

Following his failure at the Anthéor viaduct the low-level technique he would use for the rest of the war came together in Cheshire's mind. For the bombing force to be effective he had to wait upon good weather, as good visibility was essential at the target. In addition, the target would need to be illuminated. A marker aircraft would come in first and drop a hooded parachute flare at 5,000 feet. Next, a low-level target-marking aircraft would come in at 4,000 feet, identify the target building and make a 30-degree dive attack on it, releasing the marker flare at 100 feet directly upon the roof of the target. Though he had been doing this with the Lancaster, the heavy bomber was really not well suited to the job. Cheshire believed the low marker aircraft should be fast and more manoeuvrable. The Mosquito seemed an ideal choice. With the target marked, the main bombing force of Lancasters would come in, one by one, dropping their bombs on the marker. Noting how things can change in the course of military operations, the attacking force had to be able to adapt to the conditions faced. This meant communication between the leader and the bombing aircraft he was directing. This sort of ongoing radio communication over enemy territory was a big break from the Bomber Command method, which operated over the continent in strict radio silence.

Regrouping after the viaduct raid, 617 commenced upon a series of attacks marked by astonishing accuracy, destroying an aircraft factory at Albert 2 March, a needle roller bearing factory at Saint-Étienne 4 March, the Michelin plant at Clermont-Ferrand on 16 March, the Tuilieres power station at Bergerac on 18 March, and the power station at Lyon on 25 March. The destruction continued into April when a version of Cheshire's low-level marking technique was used in raids against Toulouse on 5 April 1944, Saint-Cyr-l'École (fr) 10 April 1944, and the Juvisy marshalling yards on 18/19 April.

==== Second meeting with Harris ====
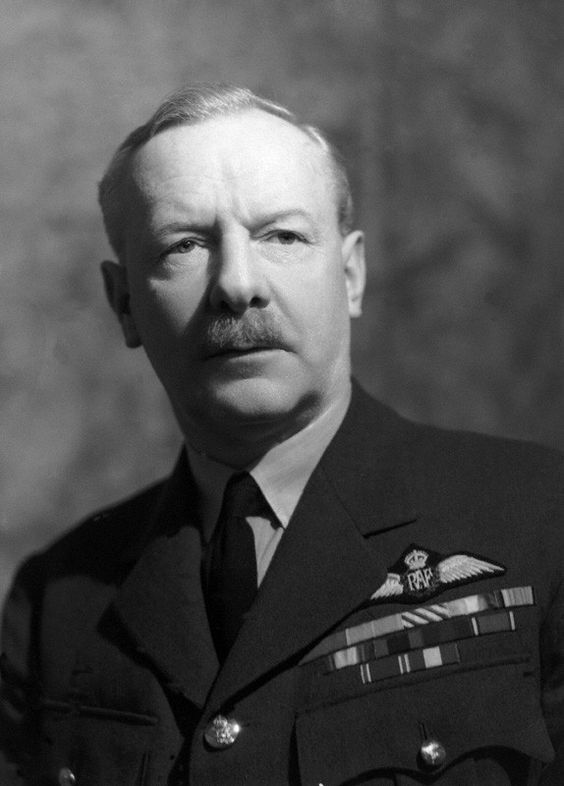
AOC Bomber Command Arthur Harris

With the string of successes in low-level marking Cochrane took Cheshire to see Harris to discuss their marking technique, request the use of Mosquito aircraft, and ask that 5 Group be allowed to mark for themselves against targets in Germany. Harris heard what they had to say, and though Cheshire's squadron had a good track record against lightly defended targets in France, it was likely going to be another story if they were to attempt such a technique against one of the heavily defended targets in Germany. There was a target in Germany that Harris felt he had yet to hit adequately: Munich. Said Harris "Mark me Munich and I will give you the Mosquitos. Miss Munich and you will lose the Mosquitos." They would be allowed four Mosquito aircraft on loan from PFF. Using these four and the rest of 617 in Lancasters as back up, they were to mark the railway yard at Munich for 5 Group, who were tasked with the yard's destruction.

==== Munich raid ====
Though delighted with the opportunity, Harris had selected about the most difficult target for Cheshire to reach. It was a great distance to fly, and would be at the limit of the Mosquito's range. Their course had to be direct, with no flying around well-defended targets. Even so, they would be cutting it pretty thin. With the fuel range limit of the Mosquito they would have 3 minutes time over the target, and 15 minutes of fuel left when they got back. After he explained the mission to the four navigators who would be in the Mosquitos, there was general disbelief. The common belief was if they were lucky enough to survive the mission they would most likely be spending the rest of the war in a Luftwaffe prison camp. The Mosquitos moved forward to RAF Manston in Kent, the nearest airfield for the mission. On the night of 24/25 April, four Mosquitos of 617 set out to mark the Munich railway yard for 5 Group.

Cheshire and the three other Mosquitos caught up and got ahead of the Main Force heavies, arriving right on time at Zero minus 5 minutes. Pathfinder Force Lancasters were already above the railway yard, dropping their illumination flares over the target. The target area was well lit, though there was intense flak over the target. Not pausing, Cheshire dived straight for his target building near the railway yard, dropping his marker at rooftop height. He then made a slow, wide circle of the yard to evaluate the effect of the bombing. The heavy bombers came in, dropped their loads on the marker and the railway yard was destroyed. Their raid against Munich was successful, and all four Mosquitos made it back. True to his word, Harris allowed Cheshire to keep them.

==== Mailly-le-Camp ====
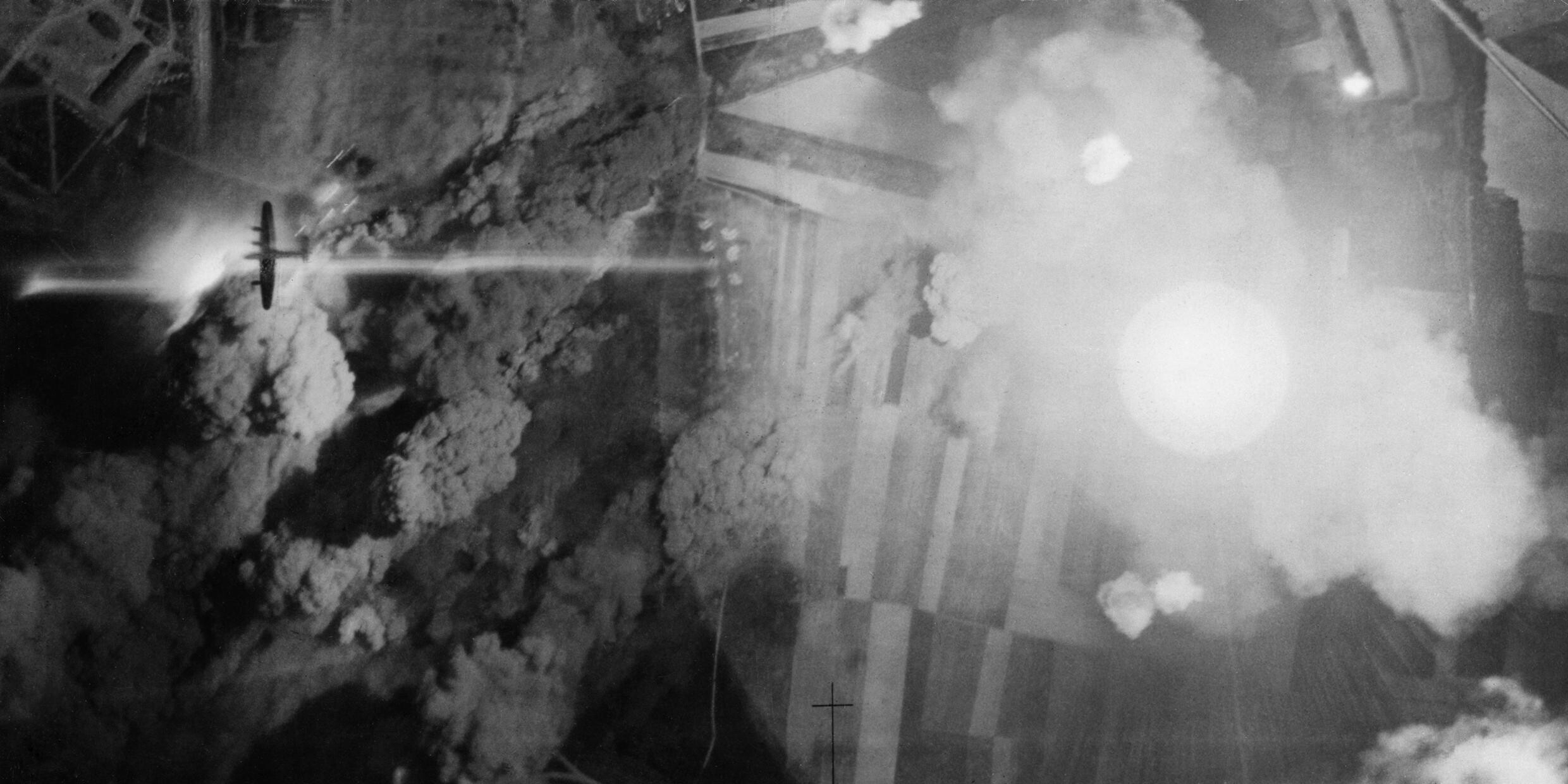
A low-flying Lancaster (left) is seen through the glare of a burning Mailly-le-Camp in France

As part of the preparatory effort against the German defences in northern France, the panzer training camp northeast of Paris at Mailly-le-Camp was targeted for destruction. The camp was French, built for their armoured formations, but since the fall of France the Germans had been using it to train replacement crews for units refitting from losses suffered in the east. Cheshire with his four marker Mosquitos from 617 were tasked with marking the target, and 346 Lancasters from 1 Group and 5 Group were tasked with destroying it. On the night of 3/4 May Cheshire approached the target for a typical low-marking technique raid, with Cheshire and Shannon making the initial marking, and Lancasters from 83 Squadron and 97 Squadron serving as back-up marker aircraft. An assembly point marker was dropped 15 miles away from the target, and the aircraft of the two groups of heavy bombers were ordered to orbit it at stacked altitudes of 100 feet separation while awaiting instructions to attack. Unbeknownst to Cheshire, that night the US Armed Services Radio was broadcasting big band swing music on the same frequency Cheshire was using for his raid. Arriving over the target, an illumination flare provided excellent visibility and Cheshire swept in low and marked the target, but when the Main Force Controller called in the waiting Lancasters no one received his message. Meanwhile, Luftwaffe night fighters began to arrive. It was a clear night with a full moon, and soon the night fighters got in among the circling bombers. The air combat over France that night was short, but intense. Crews reported seeing four or five Lancasters falling from the sky at a time. 5 Group lost 14 bombers, while 1 Group making up the second wave lost 28. After a delay of some 15 minutes the Deputy 'Main Force Controller' took over and ordered the bombers in. The training base at Mailly-le-Camp was hit heavily. 114 barrack buildings, 47 transport sheds, 37 tanks and 65 other vehicles were all destroyed in the attack, while 218 soldiers were killed and 156 more were wounded. However Bomber Command suffered the loss of 42 Lancasters and their crews, with another Lancaster written off after it made it back to base. The training base was destroyed, but Bomber Command suffered a loss rate of 11.6%.

==== D-day deception ====
To support the D-day landings, 617 Squadron was given an unusual mission. It was tasked with pulling off a "spoof" raid. The squadron was to make a series of low-level approaches to the Pas de Calais, dropping window (chaff) with each pass. If delivered sequentially the window might simulate the approach of an invasion fleet and confuse the enemy about the real D-day landings in Normandy. 617 was disappointed, and felt they should be used in a more conventional manner to destroy real targets, but they did as they were told. In fact, they were the only unit that could pull it off. On the night of 5/6 June 1944, 617 Squadron used precision flying to drop window over the channel at low level in succession, generating the radar appearance of large numbers of approaching ships. This "spoof" raid simulated the approach for an amphibious landing in the Pas de Calais. In retrospect Cheshire felt they may have saved more lives with this mission than in any of the others they did.

==== V weapon storage sites ====
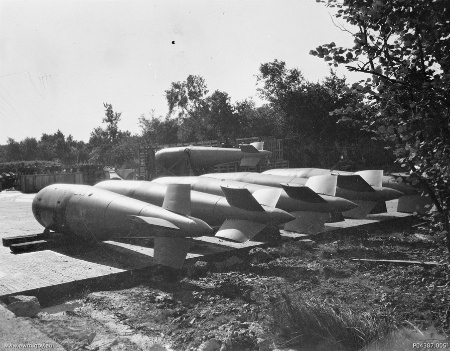
617 Squadron storage area for their Tallboy bombs

Following the invasion 617 went back to attacking the buried reinforced concrete V-1 and V-2 storage sites. It flew against and destroyed the sites at Wizernes, and followed with Watten.

On 14 June 1944, 617 squadron made a daylight attack upon the E-boat pens at Le Havre. The pens protected fifteen E-boats, which posed a threat to the invasion fleet. Attacking the pens with Tallboys, the roof was caved in, and all but one of the E-boats were damaged beyond use. In addition, 617 attacked the German ships in Le Havre by dropping Tallboys into the waters of the harbour. The explosions were so strong that ten ships were blown straight out of the water and onto the quayside. Commented Cheshire, "Barnes Wallis had a big bomb."

On 25 June Cheshire was tasked with a daylight raid against the Siracourt V-1 bunker, a storage bunker and launch site for V-1 flying bombs made of reinforced concrete buried in the earth. Cheshire had lost his Mosquitos, as another squadron asserted a prior claim on them. Desiring a manoeuvrable replacement aircraft to mark the target, he considered a Mustang as ideal, but he knew he would never get the Royal Air Force to give him one. Instead, he turned to the Americans, who had a wealth of aircraft and a favourable opinion of Cheshire. The fighter plane arrived boxed up in its packaging crate on the day he was to fly the mission. Flying the Mustang posed a number of problems for Cheshire, one of which being he had not flown a single-seat aircraft since his training days. However, his major problem was working out a course to the target. He had never flown without a navigator, and now he found himself in the position of having to ask for help. He swallowed his pride and asked the squadron's navigators to help him work out his course, while the ground crew put together the Mustang. His crew finished the job by late afternoon, some time after the Lancasters had taken off. With no time for a test flight, off he went to chase down the Lancasters. The machine worked beautifully, with Cheshire arriving over the target just as the high illumination flares were being dropped. He marked the target, and the Lancasters landed three Tallboys on it, destroying it utterly.

==== Raid on the V-3 site at Mimoyecques ====
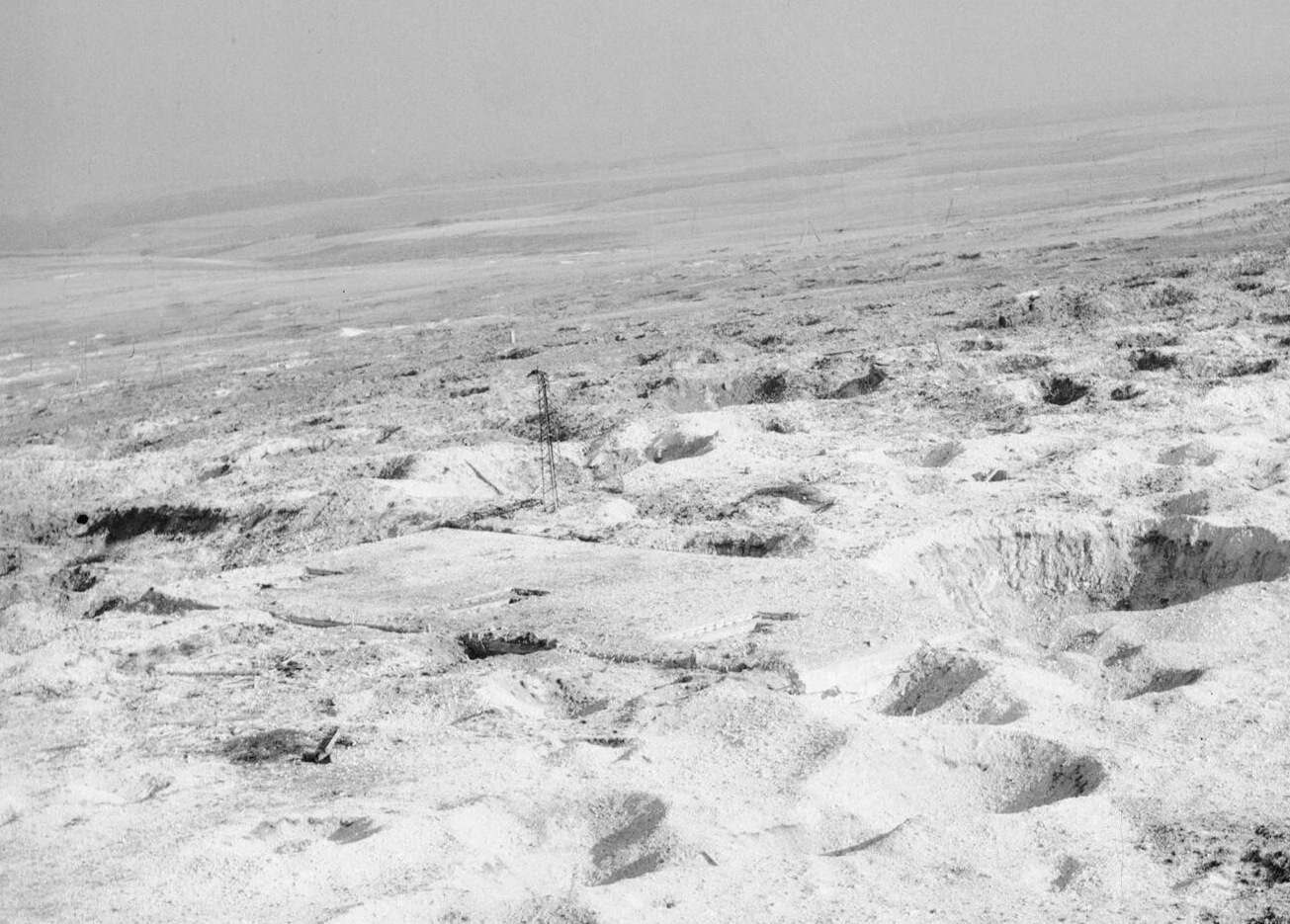
Concrete slab at the bomb-cratered German secret weapon site at Mimoyecques

On 6 July 1944 the Mimoyecques V-3 site finally was attacked. This was the mission he had been waiting for. In a daylight attack, Cheshire marked the target for the 617 Squadron heavies, which each carried a Tallboy. The caves collapsed, bringing the V-3 threat to an end.

On the night of 7/8 July 617 Squadron flew against the limestone cave at Saint-Leu-d'Esserent. The cave was being used to store V-1s and V-2s. Cheshire flew as the target marker in his Mustang. It was his 100th mission, and would be his last with Bomber Command. Tallboy strikes caused a partial collapse of the cave, and the tunnels were blocked off. The following day Cochrane took Cheshire off ops. He also stood down Shannon, Munro and McCarthy, the surviving 617 pilots from the Dams raid.

After the completion of his fourth tour of duty in July 1944 Cheshire was awarded the Victoria Cross. The Victoria Cross is usually bestowed for a particularly marked event of bravery. In Cheshire's case, the award was given for his behaviour over the course of his entire operational career. At the investiture ceremony at Buckingham Palace, both Cheshire and warrant officer Norman Jackson were to receive the VC from King George VI on that day. Despite the disparity in rank, Cheshire insisted they approach the King together. Upon reaching the King, Jackson recalled Cheshire offering "This chap stuck his neck out more than I did – he should get his VC first." The King kept to protocol and awarded the Group Captain first, but Jackson later stated he would "never forget what Cheshire said."

=== Nagasaki and discharge from the RAF ===
Cheshire and William Penney were official observers in the British Military Mission to the United States, observing the nuclear bombing of Nagasaki. New York Times journalist William L. Laurence who flew in the same plane, mentions him in his article. The vantage point was in the support B-29 Big Stink. He did not witness the event as close up as anticipated due to aircraft commander James Hopkins' failure to link up with the other B-29s. Hopkins was meant to join with the others over Yakushima but he circled at 39,000 ft (12,000 m) instead of the agreed height of 30,000 ft (9,100 m). He tried to justify this by the need to keep the VIP passengers out of danger but Cheshire thought that Hopkins was "overwrought". Cheshire later said of the experience "with such utter devastation before our eyes, how imperative to do something to see that it should never happen again."

By now Cheshire was desperate to return to England, and sent in applications and asked for interviews to quicken the process. Instead, the Air Ministry posted him to the Gulf of Mexico to teach low-level marking to the United States Army Air Forces, but he refused to do it. Finally he got his way and returned, but first had to report on his experiences at Nagasaki to the Prime Minister. He had been asked to do the job by Winston Churchill, but had to report to new Prime Minister Clement Attlee, who was startled by Cheshire's insistence that the answer to peace was more research into the development of atomic energy as a means of propulsion into space. Cheshire told Attlee that the race would be won by the efficacy of the means of delivering atom bombs and the means of protecting stockpiles from destruction. He suggested to Attlee that thinking should move away from conventional aircraft and rockets on Earth and to launch into Space. Cheshire noted that Attlee did not seem impressed.

Shortly after this conversation, Cheshire was summoned to his final Medical board and was told he had been diagnosed with psycho-neurosis and needed a year's complete rest. He was retired from the RAF with a disability pension on 22 January 1946, retaining his final rank of Group Captain. RAF doctors sent him to St Luke's Woodside hospital at Muswell Hill for rest and observation.

=== Cheshire as officer ===
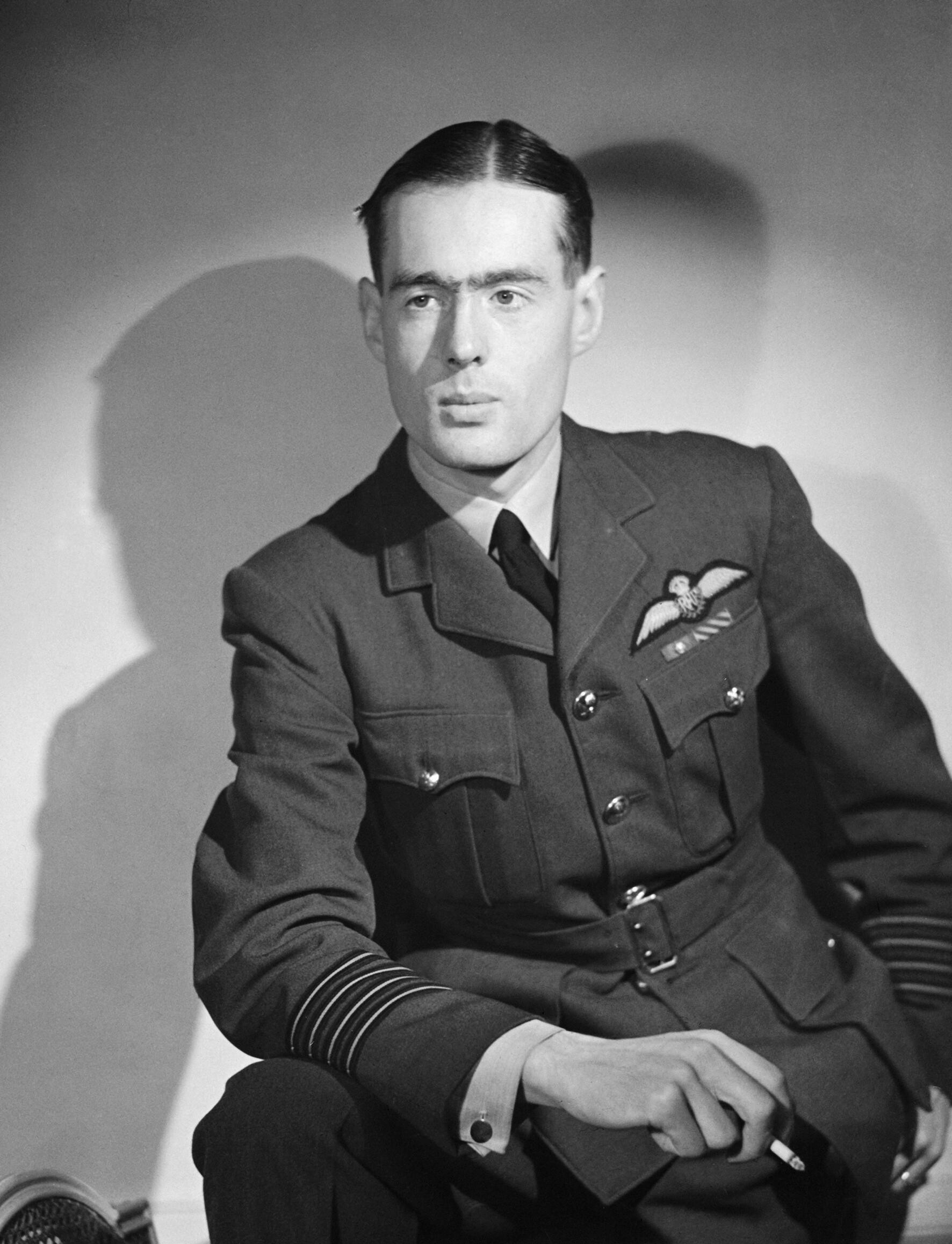
A portrait of Cheshire in 1945

Cheshire did not view himself as a talented pilot and believed continuous flying was necessary to maintain his skills. However, he was regarded as an effective captain who possessed flair and good fortune. It was commonly known among crews that he was lucky, and that is one reason he felt they liked to fly with him. By the end of the war nearly all the pilots he had trained with had not survived. It was his good luck, he believed, that had kept him alive when so many other, better pilots had been killed.

His method for dealing with dangerous situations was to go straight for them. He saw no sense in waiting. He felt worrying about the dangers would only exhaust one's mind. Instead, he relied on the natural instinct for self-preservation to help get him out of tight spots. To this was added his ability to close his mind completely to the dangers he was facing. Though a very imaginative thinker, Cheshire possessed the ability to block out of his mind any thought to the risks. He approached each mission with an easy manner.

Cheshire was a great leader of men. In contrast to Guy Gibson, Cheshire was approachable, and made it a point to know the name of every man on base, including the ground crews. He took the time to speak with them, and contrived various methods to reach out to them. Technical questions about his aircraft were an easy point of conversation. Afterwards, he would share a cigarette with the young man, and talk over his personal concerns. He wanted each man to have a sense that he knew them and liked them. Cheshire believed this was critical to the effectiveness of his squadron. He invoked great loyalty in his men, as it was clear he was devoted to their needs and was willing to take practical steps to improve the safety and success of their missions. He made a personal example of what was required, and relied on his example and the crews' determination not to let him down to lead them through some of the war's most difficult raids.

Cheshire was resolute when dealing with any pilot or crew member in his squadron who would not fly missions. Lack of Moral Fibre might show up as a member feigning illness, frequent early returns with technical problems, or flying over the North Sea and dropping bombs into the ocean, then flying about till the time of return was about right. Though a brilliant and sympathetic leader, he later wrote "I was ruthless with LMF. I had to be. We were airmen, not psychiatrists. Of course we had concern for any individual whose internal tensions meant that he could no longer go on, but there was a worry that one really frightened man could affect others around him." Cheshire would take a crew member with confidence problems aboard his own aircraft till they sorted things out, but pilots he transferred out immediately.

Cheshire was no great respecter of authority. On one mission near the end of his tour with 35 Squadron he looked at the route map to the target and noted there would be a great deal of flak over the chosen flight path. Asked afterwards about their flight, Cheshire wryly replied "We took a different route." Softly-spoken, considerate and thoughtful, he was also unorthodox, independently minded and unconventional in his thinking. He was both the youngest group captain in the service and the most decorated. Historian Max Hastings wrote: "Cheshire was a legend in Bomber Command, a remarkable man with an almost mystical air about him, as if he somehow inhabited a different planet from those about him, but without affectation or pretension." Said Flight Sergeant Tom Gallantry, DFC, who served under Cheshire in 76 Squadron: "I felt at the time, and I have always felt, that it was an honour to be a member of his squadron. Everyone felt the same way about him. Air crew... ground crew. He was a terrific character."

== Post War: VIP Colony and Le Court Cheshire Home ==
At St Luke's hospital, Cheshire was free to come and go and soon had a thriving correspondence with old contacts, trying to find a purpose to replace life in the Air Force. Based on his successful book Bomber Pilot and other writing work, he got a job working as a journalist for the Sunday Graphic, discharged himself from hospital and temporarily took up residence in the Mayfair Hotel.

By the end of 1946, Cheshire took a house in Kensington Gardens and continued his search for meaning. Bemoaning a lack of the war spirit and unity of purpose, he put out a call in his column to set-up a colony for ex-service men and women as a way of easing the transition between life in the service and as civilians, and was overwhelmed by support. He decided to start a communal living experiment called 'Vade in Pacem' (in English, 'Go in Peace') first at Gumley Hall in Leicestershire, and then at Le Court in Hampshire later that year – a house and estate he had bought from his aunt. His aim in establishing the VIP Colony was to provide an opportunity for ex-servicemen and women and their families to live together, each contributing to the community what they could to help their transition back into civilian life. He hoped that training, prosperity and fulfilment would result from united effort and mutual support. He saw the community as one way of continuing to work towards world peace. The community, however, did not prosper and the project came to an end in 1947.

At the beginning of 1948, Cheshire heard about Arthur Dykes, who had been one of Cheshire's original "VIP" community at Le Court, and was dying from cancer. Dykes asked Cheshire to give him some land to park a caravan until he recovered, but Cheshire discovered that Dykes was terminally ill and that this diagnosis was concealed from him. He told Dykes the real position and invited him to stay at Le Court. Cheshire learned nursing skills and was soon approached to take in a second patient, a 94-year-old woman recovering from a stroke. She was followed by others, some coming to stay and others to help. Although Le Court had no financial support, and his situation was financially perilous most of the time, money somehow always seemed to arrive in the nick of time to stave off disaster.

Cheshire had identified a gap in the new National Health Service (NHS) and more were to come to him for help, willing to contribute their National Insurance payments and keen to share a home with others where they could make friends and all chip in together. By the summer of 1949 Le Court had 24 residents with complex needs, illnesses and impairments, and a tuberculosis ward. The local GP and others had misgivings about the project, but as Cheshire pointed out, no matter how basic or unsatisfactory it was from a medical viewpoint, the alternative for most of the people accepted to Le Court was much worse.

As word spread, referrals came from the new NHS hospitals already struggling to cope with waiting lists of people needing urgent care. Disabled people were at the very bottom of the list of priorities, often left to manage on their own, rely on others to help them get through each day or were stuck living in hospital wards. As Le Court became established, and people from different parts of the UK began to rally in response to local need for a similar home for people in their communities, the charity now known as Leonard Cheshire began. Le Court was to become the first 'Cheshire Home' and remained the flagship home of the charity Leonard Cheshire until its closure in 2007. Cheshire continued to live both at Le Court and after his second marriage, at the Sue Ryder home in Cavendish for the rest of his life.

== Humanitarian work ==
As a result of his experiences in the Second World War as a whole, Cheshire dedicated his life to peace and justice, defining it as ‘not just the absence of war or armed confrontation...peace is the effect, or consequence, of justice...we move towards peace proportionately as we succeed in removing injustice, particularly the injustice of mass starvation, and deprivation.’

As part of this work, he founded the following charities:

In 1948 his eponymous charity Leonard Cheshire, supporting people with disabilities across the world to live, learn and work as independently as they choose whatever their ability.

In 1953, Cheshire founded the Raphael Pilgrimage to enable sick and disabled Christians to travel to Lourdes on pilgrimage.

In 1959 with wife Sue Ryder, Ryder-Cheshire. This charity was set up for joint projects that did not fall under their respective foundations, and began with the founding of Raphael in Dehra Dun, India. Initially Raphael was for people with leprosy and tuberculosis (TB) and their families and continues today rehabilitating children with learning disabilities and those with TB. The UK branch of Ryder-Cheshire closed in 2010 and remaining funds were used to set up Target Tuberculosis and Enrych (previously Ryder Cheshire Volunteers). Target Tuberculosis concentrated on the eradication of TB in Africa and Asia, and closed in 2016. Enrych continues to work supporting people with disabilities by providing access to leisure and learning opportunities through volunteers. In Australia, Ryder-Cheshire Australia continues to support Raphael in India, a home at Klibur Domin in Timor-Leste also two Australian Homes in Mt. Gambier and Melbourne.

In 1990, towards the end of his life, Cheshire founded the UK charity the World Memorial Fund for Disaster Relief. He was increasingly concerned with remembrance, and the effects of natural and man-made disaster on the lives of disabled people and others experiencing injustice, hence the charity's motto ‘for every life lost, a life saved’. To raise money for the charity, concert The Wall – Live in Berlin by former Pink Floyd member Roger Waters was staged in Potsdamer Platz, Berlin. Cheshire opened this concert by blowing a Second World War whistle.

Cheshire's concerns with making Remembrance Day more meaningful for modern times was influential in the concept of the National Memorial Arboretum, founded by Commander David Childs CBE, Director of the World Memorial Fund for Disaster Relief. Childs was involved in the winding up of the Memorial Fund after Cheshire's death in 1992; he took each phrase of the fund's slogan ‘for every life lost, a life saved’ and created new projects out of remaining funds. For ‘a life saved’ in 1996 Childs and the trustees created The Leonard Cheshire Chair of Conflict Recovery, headed by an army surgeon, which provided advice to devastated post-conflict regions. This Chair was based at University College London at the Leonard Cheshire Research Centre, now called the UCL International Disability Research Centre. To ‘Remember a life lost’ they created the National Memorial Arboretum near Lichfield in Staffordshire. The amphitheatre at the Arboretum is dedicated to the memory of Leonard Cheshire, and is surrounded by his favourite tree the Copper Beech. The Millennium Chapel of Peace and Forgiveness contains the Cavendish Cross, carved by Ken Willoughby of the Essex Woodcarvers as a tribute to the life and work of Sue Ryder and Leonard Cheshire.

== Christian faith ==
Cheshire's adoption of the Roman Catholic faith had nothing to do with the bombing of Nagasaki: "Many assumed that it was Nagasaki which emptied him; as Cheshire kept pointing out, however, it was the war as a whole. Like Britain herself, he had been fighting or training for fighting since 1939". Cheshire had been brought up a Christian in the Church of England, but had lapsed. In 1945, in the Vanity Fair club in Mayfair, he joined a conversation about religion. "It was absurd," he said, "to imagine that God existed, except as a convenient figure of speech. Man had invented God to explain the voice of conscience, but it was doubtful whether right or wrong existed outside the human mind. They were words affixed like labels to customs and laws which man had also invented to keep social order." To Cheshire's surprise, as he sat back, "pleased with his worldly wisdom," he was roundly rebuked for "talking such rot" by a woman friend who "was one of the last persons on earth he would have credited with" religious convictions. This gave him food for thought.

While he was nursing Arthur Dykes in 1948 the conversation turned to religion. Dykes was a lapsed Roman Catholic refinding his faith, and it was through their late night discussions that Cheshire decided to convert. Dykes died in August 1948 and, after completing the arrangements for his funeral, Cheshire read a book given him by a friend, One Lord, One Faith by Vernon Johnson, a High Anglican clergyman who had converted to Catholicism. On Christmas Eve 1948, Cheshire was received into the Catholic Church.

He received instruction from Father Henry Clarke, Petersfield's Roman Catholic parish priest at St Laurence Church. Clarke was also responsible for converting actor Alec Guinness and his wife Merula to Roman Catholicism.

Cheshire married fellow humanitarian Sue Ryder, also a Roman Catholic convert, in a private chapel at Bombay's Roman Catholic Cathedral on 5 April 1959.

Cheshire had a particular interest in the Shroud of Turin, about which he lectured and wrote books. In 1954 he embarked upon a pilgrimage to Turin with a young disabled girl and her family, who were seeking a cure from polio. Cheshire arranged with the Turin authorities for her to touch the Shroud, and later the girl and her family attributed this act of faith to her eventual recovery from the disease.

At the time of this pilgrimage, Cheshire was himself recovering from a tuberculosis infection that had destroyed one of his lungs and a few ribs; he attributed his recovery from the serious illness to the life-size replica of the shroud at the foot of his hospital bed. Cheshire lived at King Edward VII TB Hospital in Midhurst from 1952 to 1954 while recovering, and while there set up a 'Mission Bus' fitted with tape-recorded speeches on Christ's life, and a place to view a film on the Holy Shroud. The bus was parked in central London, with publicity stunts to attract visitors.

In 1992, when Cheshire knew he was dying from motor neurone disease, his last thoughts were gathered by his spiritual advisor Father Reginald C. Fuller in a book called Crossing the Finishing Line.

In 2017, on the centenary of Leonard Cheshire's birth, the Roman Catholic Diocese of East Anglia held a memorial Requiem mass to promote his cause for sainthood.

== Return to Nagasaki ==
In 1985, Cheshire featured in a documentary, Nagasaki – Return Journey.

== Private life ==
On 15 July 1941, Cheshire married the American actress Constance Binney, 21 years his senior. They divorced, childless, in January 1951.

On 5 April 1959, in Bombay's Roman Catholic Cathedral, he married Sue Ryder, also a Roman Catholic convert and humanitarian. He and Baroness Ryder were one of the few couples who both held titles in their own right. They had two children, Jeromy and Elizabeth Cheshire, and lived in Cavendish, Suffolk.

Cheshire was a lifelong tennis fan, a member of the All England Club, and an amateur tennis player well into his seventies.

== Death ==
After his diagnosis with motor neurone disease, Leonard Cheshire and Sue Ryder made a final trip to the Raphael Centre they had founded in India. This journey was documented by David Puttnam and Anglia TV in the film Indian Summer.

Cheshire was determined to be present at the unveiling of Arthur "Bomber" Harris's memorial on 31 May 1992, and attended against the advice of his doctors. He said "I would have gone even if I had to be carried on a stretcher". Cheshire died two months later at his home in the Sue Ryder Care Home at Cavendish, Suffolk, on 31 July 1992, aged 74. He is buried in the cemetery in Cavendish. Sue Ryder was interred in the same grave after her death in 2000. They are surrounded by graves of the people they lived with at the Sue Ryder Home, including Holocaust survivors from the Second World War. There is a memorial to both in St Mary the Virgin's Church, Cavendish.

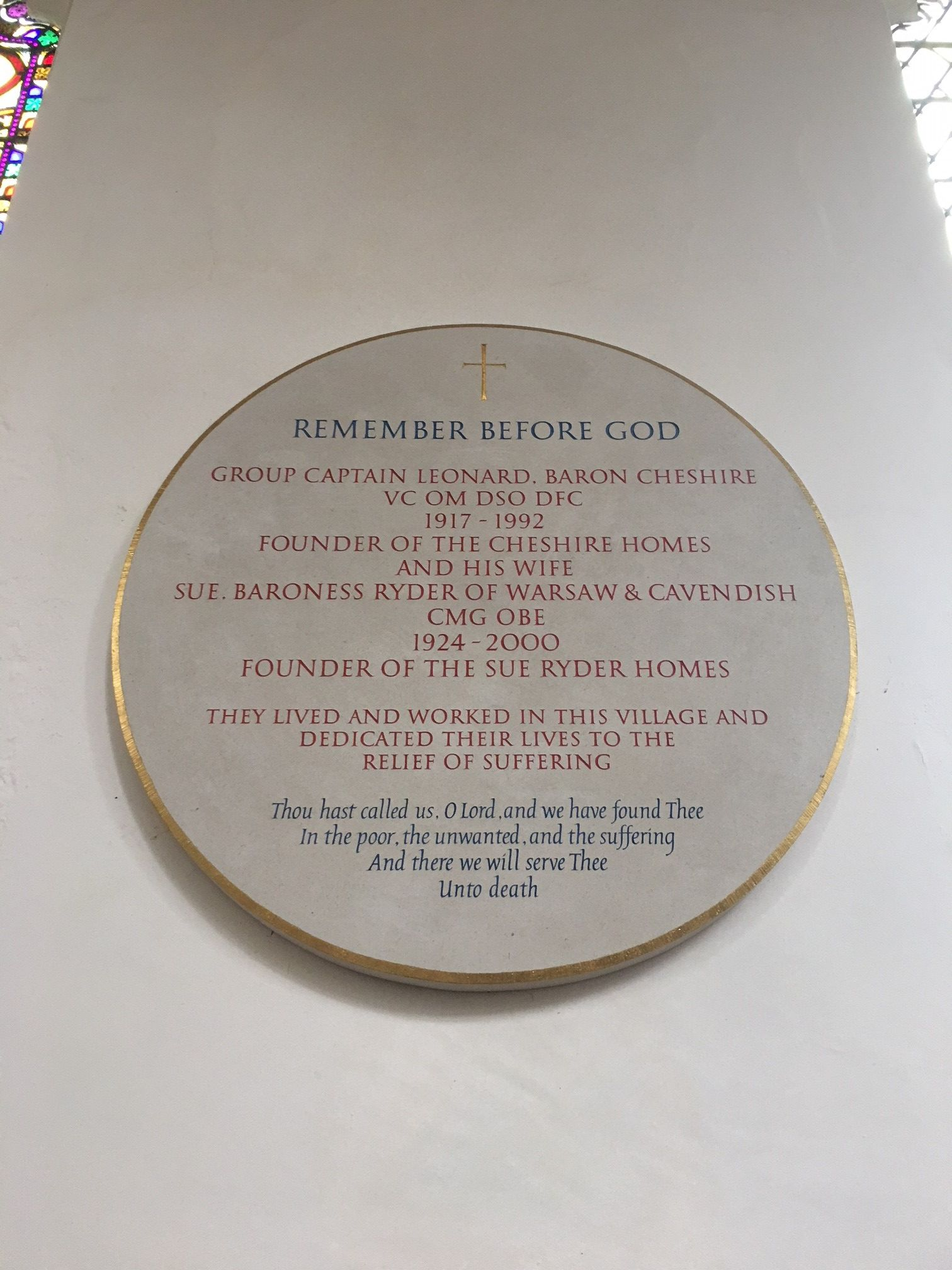
Memorial to Leonard Cheshire and Sue Ryder in St Mary's Church, Cavendish

== Honours and tributes ==
- Cheshire was the subject of This Is Your Life in 1960 when he was surprised by Eamonn Andrews in central London.
- On 17 July 1991, Cheshire was created a life peer as Baron Cheshire, of Woodhall in the County of Lincolnshire; he sat as a cross-bencher in the Lords.
- He had declined the Companion of Honour (CH) in 1977 and 1980 New Year Honours.
- Queen Elizabeth II paid personal tribute to him in her Royal Christmas Message in December 1992.
- In the 2002 BBC poll to find the 100 Greatest Britons, Cheshire attained position number 31. His Victoria Cross is displayed at the Imperial War Museum, London.
- In 2019, his old school, Stowe, opened a new girls' day house named Cheshire. Its boys' equivalent is named Winton after Nicholas Winton, another wartime Old Stoic humanitarian.
- A house at Xavier College, a private school in Melbourne, Australia, is also named after Cheshire.

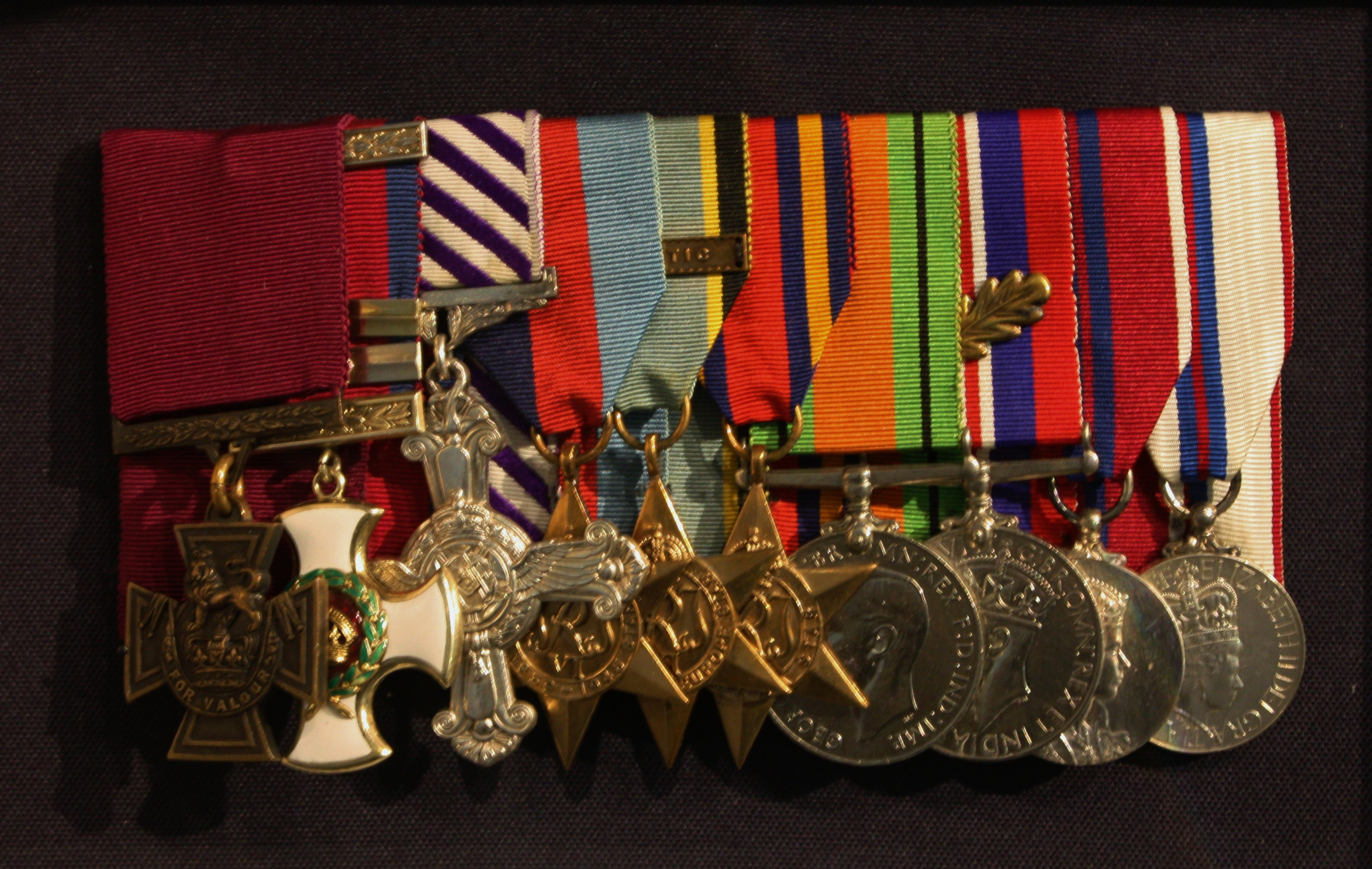
Cheshire's medal group on display at the Imperial War Museum.

Victoria Cross (VC)	8 September 1944
Member of the Order of Merit (OM)	13 February 1981
Companion of the Distinguished Service Order and Two Bars	6 December 1940
Distinguished Flying Cross (DFC)	7 March 1941
1939–45 Star	
Air Crew Europe Star	With 1 clasp Atlantic
Burma Star	
Defence Medal	
War Medal 1939–1945 with oak leaf for being Mentioned in Despatches	
Queen Elizabeth II Coronation Medal	(1953)
Queen Elizabeth II Silver Jubilee Medal	(1977)

=== Awards ===
- Distinguished Service Order 6 December 1940 (Note: Citation reads: In recognition of gallantry displayed in flying operations against the enemy, for bringing home a holed and burning Armstrong Whitworth Whitley.)
- Distinguished Flying Cross 7 March 1941
- Mentioned in Despatches for notable war services 17 March 1941
- Distinguished Service Order 20 April 1943 (Note: Citation reads: Since the award of the DFC on March 7th, 1941, Wing Commander Cheshire has completed further operational sorties. Throughout his long and exceptionally distinguished flying career most of the credit for his squadron's outstanding efficiency and success has been due to his example. His magnificent achievements have been amply proved by photographic evidence. Note: The second DSO awarded as a bar on the ribbon of the first DSO.)
- Distinguished Service Order 18 April 1944 (Note: Citation reads: This officer has commanded the squadron with notable success. Within recent months he has participated in many attacks on targets of vital importance to the enemy and the successes obtained are an excellent tribute to his outstanding tactical ability, great courage and iron determination. He is a splendid leader, whose personal example and untiring efforts have contributed in a large measure to the high standard of efficiency and fine fighting qualities of the squadron he commands." Note: The third DSO awarded as a second bar to the ribbon of the first DSO.)
- Victoria Cross 13 November 1945 (Note: Citation reads: This officer began his operational career in June 1940. Against strongly-defended targets he soon displayed the courage and determination of an exceptional leader. He was always ready to accept extra risks to ensure success. Defying the formidable Ruhr defences, he frequently released his bombs from below 2,000 feet. Over Cologne in November 1940, a shell burst inside his aircraft, blowing out one side and starting a fire. Undeterred, he went on to bomb his target. About this time he carried out a number of convoy patrols, in addition to his bombing missions. At the end of his first tour of operational duty in January 1941 he immediately volunteered for a second tour. Again, he pressed home his attacks with the utmost gallantry. Berlin, Bremen, Cologne, Duisburg, Essen and Kiel were among the heavily-defended targets which he attacked. When he was posted for instructional duties in January 1942 he undertook four more operational missions. He started a third operational tour in August 1942, when he was given command of a squadron. He led the squadron with outstanding skill on a number of missions before being appointed in March 1943 as a station commander. In October 1943 he undertook a fourth operational tour, relinquishing the rank of group captain at his own request so that he could again take part in operations. He immediately set to work as the pioneer of a new method of marking enemy targets involving very low flying. In June 1944, when marking a target in the harbour at Le Havre in broad daylight and without cloud cover, he dived well below the range of the light batteries before releasing his markerbombs, and he came very near to being destroyed by the strong barrage which concentrated on him. During his fourth tour which ended in July 1944, Wing Commander Cheshire led his squadron personally on every occasion, always undertaking the most dangerous and difficult task of marking the target alone from a low level in the face of strong defences. Wing Commander Cheshire's cold and calculated acceptance of risks is exemplified by his conduct in an attack on Munich in April 1944. This was an experimental attack to test out the new method of target marking at low level against a heavily defended target situated deep in Reich territory. Munich was selected, at Wing Commander Cheshire's request, because of the formidable nature of its light anti-aircraft and searchlight defences. He was obliged to follow, in bad weather, a direct route which took him over the defences of Augsburg and thereafter he was continuously under fire. As he reached the target, flares were being released by our high-flying aircraft. He was illuminated from above and below. All guns within range opened fire on him. Diving to 700 feet, he dropped his markers with great precision and began to climb away. So blinding were the searchlights that he almost lost control. He then flew over the city at 1,000 feet to assess the accuracy of his work and direct other aircraft. His own was badly hit by shell fragments, but he continued to fly over the target area until he was satisfied that he had done all in his power to ensure success. Eventually when he set course for base the task of disengaging himself from the defences proved even more hazardous than the approach. For a full twelve minutes after leaving the target area he was under withering fire, but he came safely through. Wing Commander Cheshire has now completed a total of 100 missions. In four years of fighting against 'the bitterest opposition' he has maintained a record of outstanding personal achievement, placing himself invariably in the forefront of the battle. What he did in the Munich operation was typical of the careful planning, brilliant execution and contempt for danger which has established for Wing Commander Cheshire a reputation second to none in Bomber Command.)
- The Harding Award, 1978. The Harding Award was started in 1971 by charities Action Medical Research and RADAR (The Royal Association for Disability and Rehabilitation) and presented annually for "outstanding work of immediate or future benefit to disabled people". In his speech, Leonard Cheshire said:

"I also, am very much aware, that although this beautiful and very symbolic award has been made to me personally, I am part of a great number of people of different nationalities and different backgrounds working together, and I am only a part... I accept it on behalf of all those connected with our homes, but also I’d like to feel that – if I may say this – That I’d also accept it on behalf of others (in so many other different ways) who are working among disabled people. On behalf of disabled people themselves, who are making such a contribution in their own way to the development and evolution of our society, because I feel very strongly that what we might for the moment call the 'world of disabled people', is a very united world. I feel very privileged to be a small part of that fraternity of people who are contributing, researching, working, and living with the objective of making life more livable for those who have some kind of disability".

- Order of Merit 5 February 1981 (Note: Awarded for humanitarian work in providing residential services for patients with complex needs, illnesses and impairments.)

== Publications by Leonard Cheshire ==
- Bomber Pilot. London: Hutchinson & Co, 1943; St Albans, Herts, UK: Mayflower, 1975. ISBN 0-583-12541-7; London: Goodall Publications ISBN 0-907579-10-8
- The Holy Face: An Account of the Oldest Photograph in the World (16-page pamphlet). Newport, Monmouthshire, UK: R. H. Johns, 1954.
- Pilgrimage to the Shroud. London: Hutchinson & Co, 1956.
- The Story of the Holy Shroud. Associated Television Ltd: ATV Library, 1957. Text of broadcast.
- The Face of Victory. London: Hutchinson & Co, 1961.
- Death (22-page pamphlet). London: Catholic Truth Society, 1978.
- The Hidden World: An Autobiography and Reflections by the Founder of the Leonard Cheshire Homes. London: Collins, 1981. ISBN 0-00-626479-4.
- The Light of Many Suns: The Meaning of the Bomb. London: Methuen, 1985. ISBN 0-413-59240-5
- Where Is God in All This?. Slough, Berks, UK: St Paul Publications, 1991. ISBN 0-85439-380-3
- Crossing the Finishing Line: Last Thoughts of Leonard Cheshire VC (Edited by Reginald C. Fuller). London: St Paul's, 1998. ISBN 0-85439-527-X.

== Cheshire's private papers ==
Photographs, private and service letters, intelligence reports, crew lists and official documents about Leonard Cheshire's service in Bomber Command have been digitised and are available online.

Cheshire set up the Leonard Cheshire Archive in 1985 to preserve the legacy of his work and those who helped him. Digitised photographs, magazines, audio, film and oral histories from him and his work can be viewed on the history website Rewind: Seven decades of stories from Leonard Cheshire. Catalogues for the Leonard Cheshire Archive's collections can be viewed on the Archives Hub.

Military offices
Preceded by Harold Martin	Officer Commanding No. 617 Squadron; November 1943 – July 1944	Succeeded by James Tait
