= Blind in Business =

Blind in Business is a British charity that helps blind and partially sighted students into employment following graduation by providing a free training and employment service. The charity offers technical help and training courses for schoolchildren with a visual impairment, while also supporting graduates and potential employers with training and technical help. It was founded in 1992 by three visually impaired graduates in order to help others in the same situation. The founders – Neil Heslop, a business planning manager with Northern Telecom who had recently experienced sight loss, Simon Meredith, a blind solicitor with Slaughter and May and Richard Hanson, a partially sighted solicitor with Cameron Markby Hewitt – were surprised to discover as many as 80 percent of people with a visual impairment were unemployed at that time, with very few in work able to pursue a career. Blind in Business was established as a charitable trust with the backing of the Royal National Institute for the Blind and with several high-profile supporters serving as its trustees, including Bank of England associate director Pen Kent, Standard Chartered chairman Rodney Galpin and Conservative MP Emma Nicholson. The organisation's head offices are based in London, but Blind in Business operates on a United Kingdom wide basis.
