= Mary Snell Rundle =

British nursing reformer

Mary Snell Rundle RRC (1874 – 13 March 1937) was a British nursing reformer. She was the first ever Secretary of the Royal College of Nursing (founded in 1916) and co-ordinated the college's work for over 17 years.

== Early life and career ==
Mary Snell Rundle was born in Saltash, Cornwall, in 1874. After her fiancé, a naval officer, died, Rundle decided to become a nurse. She moved to London to undertake her nursing training at St. Bartholomew's Hospital, where she was the first recipient of the Isla Stewart Scholarship. This funded a year of training in New York, which she took at Teacher's College, Columbia, in hospital economics and teaching in American nursing schools. She gained a certificate in massage therapy.

After returning to the UK, Rundle was appointed Assistant Matron under Rachael Cox-Davies at the Royal Free Hospital. In 1912, she became Matron of the Royal Hospital for Diseases of the Chest. During the First World War, from 1915 to 1916, Rundle was Matron of the 1st London General Hospital Territorial Army Nursing Service. She received the Royal Red Cross for her war work in 1916.

Before working at the college, she had organised some of the first postgraduate courses for nurses on tuberculosis care and health visiting. She also set up her own library.

== The Royal College of Nursing ==
In 1916, Rundle was employed as the first secretary of the College of Nursing (later Royal College of Nursing). She managed the formative years of the college for almost two decades, before retiring in 1933 due to ill-health. She co-ordinated some of the college's early work in nursing education, employment rights and pastoral care for members. During her years at the college, Rundle was on the advisory board for the London University Diploma in Nursing. Some of her most notable work was in nursing pensions, and she helped to bring in the Federated Superannuation Scheme for Nurses and Hospital Officers, launched in 1928.

Once retired Rundle was elected to sit on the College of Nursing Council for three years 1934 -1937.

During her time at the College of Nursing Rundle was also vice-president of the League of Nurses at St. Bartholomew's Hospital, and a member of the first council of the Nation's Nurses and Professional Women's Club (later Cowdray Club), which was founded in 1922 as a members' club for professional women. In 1925 she was awarded the Diploma in Nursing from Leeds University.

Mary Rundle died in London, at her home in St John's Wood, on 13 March 1937. Her funeral was held on 17 March.
