= Jocelyn Woollcombe =

British naval officer (1898–1986)

Dame Jocelyn Woollcombe DBE
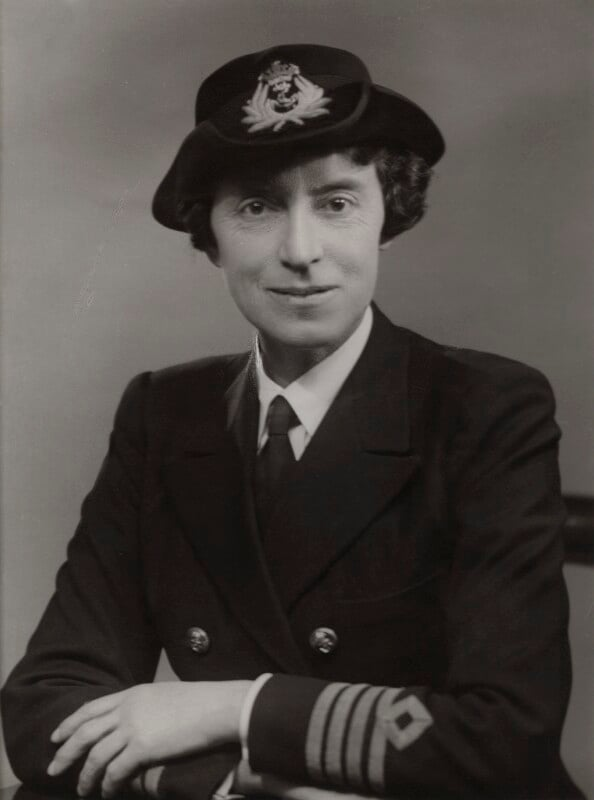
- Woollcombe in 1943
- Born: Jocelyn May Woollcombe; 9 May 1898
- Died: 30 January 1986 (aged 87)
- Military career
- Allegiance: United Kingdom
- Branch: Women's Royal Naval Service
- Service years: 1939–1950
- Rank: Director
- Commands: Women's Royal Naval Service (1946–50)
- Conflicts: Second World War
- Awards: Dame Commander of the Order of the British Empire

Dame Jocelyn May Woollcombe, DBE (9 May 1898 – 30 January 1986) was Director of the Women's Royal Naval Service (WRNS) from 1946 to 1950.

She joined the WRNS as a chief officer in August 1939 and was promoted superintendent on 14 May 1940.

== Honours ==
She was appointed Commander of the Order of the British Empire (CBE) in 1944 and Dame Commander of the Order of the British Empire (DBE) in 1950.

== Post-war ==
- Hon. ADC to HM, the King – 1949
- General Secretary, British Council for Aid to Refugees (Hungarian Section) – 1957–1958
- Governor, The Sister Trust – 1956–1965
- Governor WRNS Benevolent Trust – 1942–1967
- President, Association of Wrens – 1959–1981

== Sources ==
- Stark, Suzanne. Female tars: Women aboard ship in the age of sail; Naval Inst. Press: Annapolis, Maryland (1996); ISBN 1557507384/LCCN#95046459.
