= Nigger (dog) =

Labrador Retriever owned by Guy Gibson

- Nigger (bottom centre) with members of No. 106 Squadron, (Gibson's previous unit); he appears to be wearing a German Iron Cross or similar decoration on his collar. His owner, Wg Cdr Guy Gibson, is crouching on the right with a pipe in his mouth.
- Species: Dog (Canis lupus familiaris)
- Breed: Labrador Retriever
- Sex: Male
- Died: 16 May 1943; RAF Scampton, United Kingdom
- Resting place: RAF Scampton, United Kingdom; 53.30006°N 0.55197°W
- Occupation: Squadron mascot
- Owner: Wing Commander Guy Gibson

Nigger was a male black Labrador Retriever belonging to Wing Commander Guy Gibson of the Royal Air Force, and the mascot of No. 617 Squadron. Gibson owned the dog when he was previously a member of 106 Squadron. Nigger often accompanied Gibson on training flights and was a great favourite of the members of both 106 and 617 Squadrons. He was noted for his liking of beer, which he drank from his own bowl in the Officers' Mess.

Nigger died on 16 May 1943, the day of the famous "Dambusters" raid, when he was hit by a motorist. He was buried at midnight as Gibson was leading the raid. "Nigger" (Morse code: -. .. --. --. . .-. ) was the codeword Gibson used to confirm the breach of the Möhne Dam. Nigger's grave is at Royal Air Force station Scampton, Lincolnshire. In July 2020 the headstone was replaced, with his name removed. The RAF said it "did not want to give prominence to an offensive term that went against its ethos".

In 2023, the RAF's request for listed building consent to move the dog's grave to another airbase was refused.

== Name ==
The word nigger was often used as a dog's name during the early part of the 20th century. A black explosive sniffer dog named Nigger served with a Royal Engineers mine clearance unit in 1944 during the Normandy Campaign. The black dog leading a sled dog team on the Terra Nova Expedition to the Antarctic (1910–1913) was also named Nigger. The term was not considered offensive in the UK until the 1950s, being found earlier in novels and other contexts and causing no remark at the time.

== Portrayal on film ==
=== Censorship ===
Nigger was portrayed in the 1955 British war film The Dam Busters, in which he was mentioned by name frequently. In 1999, British television network ITV broadcast a censored version of the film, with all instances of the name removed. ITV blamed regional broadcaster London Weekend Television, which in turn alleged that a junior staff member had been responsible for the unauthorised cuts. When ITV again showed a censored version in June 2001, it was criticised by Index on Censorship as "unnecessary and ridiculous" and because the edits introduced continuity errors. The code word "nigger" transmitted in Morse code upon the successful completion of the central mission was not censored. More recently, in 2012, ITV3 showed the film uncut a few times, but with a warning at the start that it contains racial terms from the period which some people may find offensive. In 2013 the film was shown by Channel 5 uncut and without any warning. On Thursday 17 May 2018 an uncut version was shown on the UK channel Film4 with a warning explaining the film was historical and that some would find it to be racially offensive.

Some edited American versions of the film have used dubbing to change Nigger's name to Trigger.

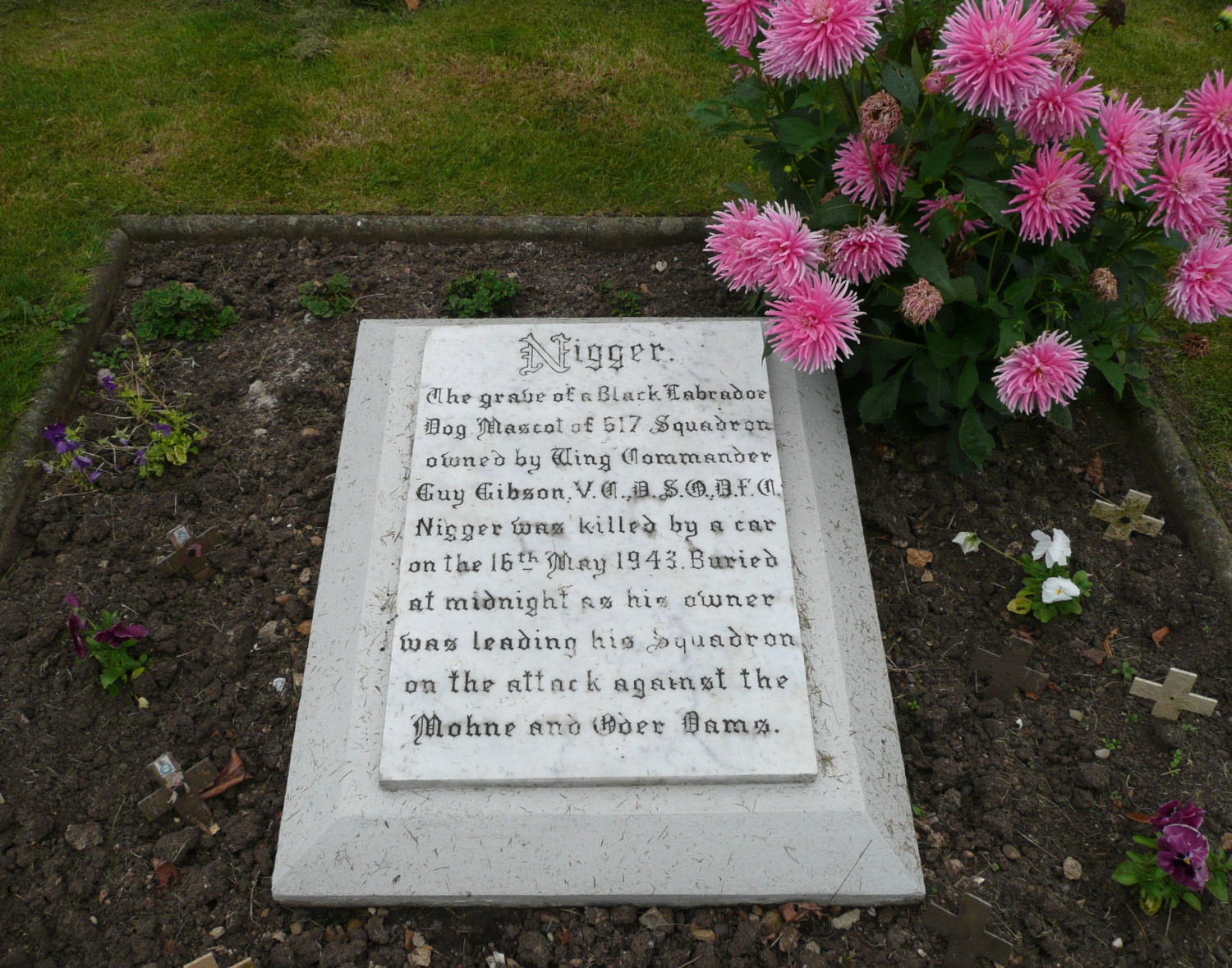
Nigger's grave up until July 2020

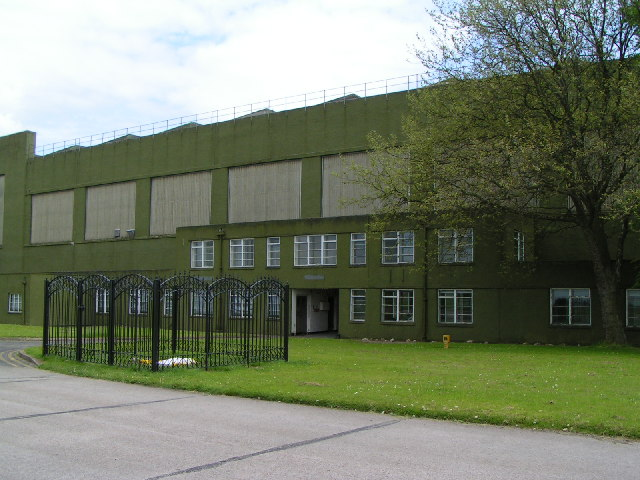
Area around the grave

=== Symbolism ===
Film critics have observed that Nigger is used in the film as a symbol of the men's emotional attachment to one another, an attachment that is not directly expressed between the film's characters. Sarah Street notes that the film, while full of emotion, does not articulate it except through secondary devices such as the affection that the characters are shown giving to Nigger. Christine Geraghty, a lecturer in media studies, observed that "Gibson's suppression of feelings is presented as appropriate rather than problematic, and the use of the dog as his most explicit emotional attachment is in keeping with the way in which class and masculinity are brought together in this isolated but self-sufficient figure." James Chapman, lecturer at the Open University, adds to that the observation that the scene where Gibson is shown choking back his grief at the death of Nigger, silent and blinking awkwardly, is an example of the stiff upper lip behaviour characteristic of British war films of the genre.

==== Renaming ====
Richard Todd, who played Gibson in the film, was interviewed on BBC Radio 4's Today programme in 2005 along with Jonathan Falconer, author of a book about the film, about the name of the dog and whether any remake of the film should retain the name. Todd, in a pre-recorded interview, said:

With political correctness which is a new concept of a way of life in this country and I think all over the world it didn't exist when we made the original film so Nigger was Nigger, but nowadays you can't say that sort of thing.

In response to being asked whether the name should be censored in a remake, Falconer said:

No. I think it's a question of historical accuracy here ... the film and obviously the events are very much part of the time they were made in and took part in and so I think tinkering with the historical accuracy of the film and of the story is a very dangerous and slippery slope to start down.

In response to being asked whether he thought people would accept this as historical accuracy, Falconer said:

Well they ought to. If they are being objective about it then I think they should accept it as historical accuracy, but I can understand why some people may find it offensive.

In the same interview, George Baker, who also acted in the film, in response to being asked whether any opinion had been expressed on the name at the time that the film was made, said:

No, none at all. Political correctness wasn't even invented, and an awful lot of black dogs were called Nigger.

Peter Jackson, producer of a planned remake of the film, said in 2006 that "It is not our intention to offend people. But really you are in a no-win, damned-if-you-do-and-damned-if-you-don't scenario: If you change it, everyone's going to whinge and whine about political correctness. And if you don't change it, obviously you are offending a lot of people inadvertently. ... We haven't made any decisions about what we'll do." Stephen Fry, writer for the remake, was asked to provide several alternative names for the dog, and came up with several suggestions. Executive producer David Frost rejected them all, saying "Guy sometimes used to call his dog Nigsy, so I think that's what we will call it. Stephen has been coming up with other names, but this is the one I want." Jackson's assistant contradicted this a week later, however, saying "To stay true to the story, you can't just change [the name]. We have not made any decisions yet. The script is still being written; and that decision will be made closer to the time." Later Fry said the dog would be renamed "Digger".

In 2012, historian and writer James Holland commented that controversy over the dog's name seems to have overshadowed other aspects of the raid. When he told people that he was planning to write a book on the raid, 9 out of 10 replied "What are you going to call the dog?" He found that the three characters connected with the raid that most people had heard of were Guy Gibson, Barnes Wallis, and Nigger.

== See also ==
- List of individual dogs
- List of Labrador Retrievers
