= Johnny-head-in-air =

Johnny-head-in-air may refer to:

- Hans Guck-in-die-Luft, a character in Struwwelpeter
- For Johnny, a 1941 war poem by John Pudney
