= Ley Kenyon =

English artist and illustrator (1913–1990)

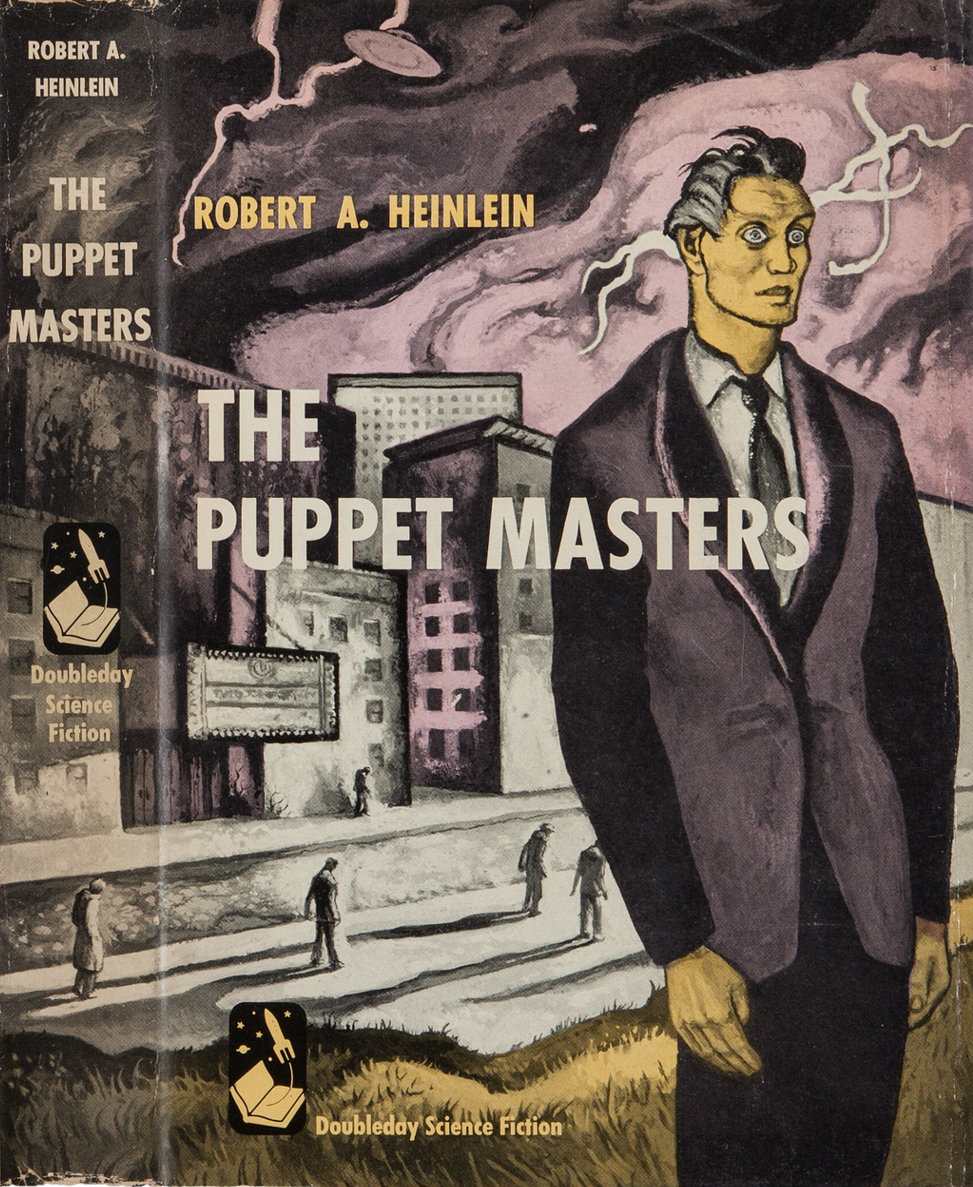

Bennett Ley Kenyon (28 May 1913 – 9 November 1990) was an artist, illustrator, designer, teacher and deep sea diver. During World War II he was involved in the Great Escape tunnel mass escape from the Stalag Luft III prison camp.

== Education ==
Kenyon was born in Kensington, London, educated at Marylebone Grammar School and (from 1931 to 1934) studied at the Central School of Art and Crafts. His teachers there included James Grant, Bernard Meninsky, William Roberts and Alfred Turner. Upon graduation he gained employment as a designer for a firm of sign makers.

== Wartime ==
During World War II he served in the Royal Air Force from 1940, becoming an air gunner in March 1941 and graduating as a pilot officer in October. Posted to 419 Squadron he manned the rear gun turret on over 40 missions, which eventually won him the Distinguished Flying Cross medal. But on the night of September 16, 1942 he was on board a Halifax Mk II LW240 bomber when it was shot down during a raid on Modane in France. He was captured and imprisoned in the Stalag Luft III prison camp.

To help pass the time he ran art classes for other prisoners, and soon his skills were employed by the Escape Committee's head of forgery Tim Walenn, drawing maps and forging identity passes and papers. He also kept a pictorial record of the tunnel dig. Kenyon was due to be escaper number 120, but the tunnel was discovered in March 1944 as the escape was in progress with only 76 of the planned 220 prisoners free.

Recovered after the war, his drawings were included in the first editions of Paul Brickhill's Escape to Danger (1946) and The Great Escape (1951), for which he also designed the cover. They were privately published in the 1970s as a portfolio.

== Commercial artist ==
From the late 1940s Kenyon made his living as a commercial artist and illustrator of adventure, science fiction and children's book covers for Bodley Head, Faber & Faber, Collins, Longmans Green, and other publishers. He also drew illustrations for the magazines Tatler and Illustrated London News.

Kenyon was a keen deep sea diver and underwater photographer, which led to him helping Jacques Cousteau with his underwater filming. He also wrote several books on the underwater world, illustrating them and diving books by other authors. In 1956, the News of the World launched Rocket: the Space-Age Weekly, a comic for boys, for which Kenyon wrote and drew the Professor Jack Ransom underwater adventure comic strip.

Kenyon married the Hungarian portrait artist Zsuzsi Roboz in 1953, but the relationship was short-lived. In the 1950s he was living at No. 7, Queen Elm's Square, Old Church Street in Chelsea. He was a member of London Sketch Club and (in 1967) chairman of the Chelsea Arts Club.

In later life he lectured for the British Council and acted as a teacher of young people participating in scientific expeditions. Between 1984 and 1989 he was Art Director for Operation Raleigh (1984–89), a large-scale, four-year international youth expedition involving around 4,000 young people aged 17–24. He died on November 9, 1990, in Albuquerque, New Mexico, aged 77.

== Book illustrations and jackets ==
- Norman Dale. Skeleton Island (1948)
- Jocelyn Brooke. The Wonderful Summer (1949)
- John Connell. The Return of Long John Silver (1949)
- Noel Streatfeild. The Painted Garden (1949)
- Kendell Foster Crossen (ed). Adventures in Tomorrow (1951)
- Gillian Mary Edwards. Sun of My Life (1951)
- Robert A. Heinlein. The Puppet Masters (1951)
- Lord Dunsany. The Last Revolution (1951)
- Richard Harrison. Suburban Saraband (1952)
- John Pudney. Monday Adventure: The Secrets of Blackmead Abbey (1952)
- Dennis Wheatley. Worlds Far From Here (1952)
- John Harris. The Sea Shall Not Have Them (1953)
- Hans Hass. Under the Red Sea (1953 translation)
- Ethel Mannin. Love Under Another Name (1953)
- Hans Hass. In Search of the Grey Terror; Men and Sharks (1954 translation)
- B. Henry Kuttner. Fury (1954)
- Clark Mackinnon. The Flame Lily (1954)
- Freda Barger. The Wanton Air (1955)
- Alec Brown. Angelo's Moon (1955)
- Philip K. Dick. World of Chance (1955)
- John Pudney. Thursday Adventure: The Stolen Airliner (1955)
- John Goldthorpe. No Crown of Glory (1956)
- Arthur Upfield. Man of Two Tribes (1956)
- Eileen Basing. Home Before Dark (1957)
- Roderic Graeme. Paging Blackshirt (1957)
- John Pudney. Saturday Adventure (1965)
- Kendall McDonald. The Sea Our Other World (1974), 50 Brooke Bond Tea Cards

== Author ==
- Aqualung Diving (1956 with Werner de Haas)
- Collins' Pocket Guide to the Undersea World (1956)
- Discovering the Undersea World (1961)
