= Elisabeth Kyle =

Scottish novelist and children's writer

Agnes Mary Robertson Dunlop
- Born: Agnes Mary Robertson Dunlop; January 1, 1901; Ayr
- Died: February 23, 1982 (aged 81)
- Occupation: Author
- Writing career
- Pen name: Elisabeth Kyle; Jan Ralston; Mary Forsyth
- Period: 1930–1980
- Genres: Journalism novels children's books

Elisabeth Kyle, pseudonym of Agnes Mary Robertson Dunlop (born 1 January 1901, died 23 February 1982) was a Scottish journalist and writer of novels, children's books and travel literature.

She used the pen name Jan Ralston for publication of one of her books in the United States. Some of her journalism was published under the name Mary Forsyth.

== Biography ==
Agnes Mary Robertson Dunlop was born in Ayr, Scotland on 1 January 1901. Her mother was Elizabeth Riddell Dunlop and her father was James Dunlop, a lawyer in the family firm. He was keen on literature, introducing his daughter to the classics and monitoring the books to which she was exposed. He died when she was nine years old.

As a child she had no particular intention of becoming an author, and when she finished her education became a journalist, first with the Manchester Guardian and then with the Glasgow Herald. Her journalism includes articles about other Scottish women writers such as Mary Cleland and Nan Shepherd. She wrote the regular "Ways of Women" column in the Nottingham Evening Post in the 1930s.

Kyle's earliest published works were stories in children's annuals. A large part of her output was books for children, published between the 1930s and 1980. Many of these were historical novels designed for a young audience, with heroines such as Charlotte Brontë, Mary II of England, Florence Nightingale and Clara Schumann. She wrote several novels for adults, including The Begonia Bed (1934), The Pleasure Dome (1943), The Tontine Belle (1951), and The Other Miss Evans (1958).

She gave radio talks and wrote radio plays for children and adults. One of her novels for adults, The Regent's Candlesticks (1954), was broadcast on the BBC Light Programme as Book at Bedtime in 1995. She also adapted other books for radio, such as Neil Munro's The Daft Days in 1937. In 1939 she was described in the Berwickshire News and General Advertiser as "well known as a writer for Children’s Hour, particularly in the adaptations she has made of folk tales". Her first radio talk was given on Yugoslavia and was in 1941.

Kyle travelled extensively; at the time of the publication of her first novel in 1934 she was said in the Nottingham Evening Press, to have travelled around Scandinavia by "tramp steamer", and to "know the Balkan States and their people more or less intimately". The Liverpool Post in the same year described her as "wander[ing] about Europe and America in a more or less vagabond way in order to stisfy her craving for adventure".

Dunlop was a friend of Josephine Tey and corresponded with her.

== Bibliography ==
- The Begonia Bed (1934): Constable & Co. (romance novel)
- Orangefield (1938): Constable (novel for adults)
- The Mirrors of Versailles (1939): Constable (travel)
- Broken Glass (1940): Peter Davies Ltd.
- Visitors from England (1941), illustrated by A. Mason Trotter: Peter Davies Ltd. (children's book) Republished in the US as The Mystery of the Good Adventure by Jan Ralston (Dodd Mead, 1950)
- The White Lady (1941): Peter Davies Ltd.
- Vanishing Island (1942), illustrated by A. Mason Trotter: Peter Davies Ltd. (children's book; sequel to Visitors from England)
- But We Are Exiles (1942): Peter Davies Ltd.
- Behind the Waterfall (1943), illustrated by A. Mason Trotter: Peter Davies Ltd.
- The Pleasure Dome (1943): Peter Davies Ltd.
- The Seven Sapphires (1944), illustrated by Nora Fry Lavrin: Peter Davies [1957 edition illustrated by Leslie Atkinson and published by Thomas Nelson] (children's book)
- The Skaters' Waltz (1944): Peter Davies Ltd.
- Holly Hotel (1945), illustrated by Nora Fry Lavrin: Peter Davies Ltd.
- Carp Country (1946): Peter Davies Ltd. (novel for adults set in Southern Bohemia)
- The Mirrors of Castle Doone (1947), illustrated by Nora Fry Lavrin: Peter Davies Ltd.
- Mally Lee (1947): Peter Davies Ltd. (mystery fiction)
- Lost Karin (1947), illustrated by Nora Fry Lavrin: Peter Davies Ltd.
- West Wind (1948), illustrated by Francis Gower: Peter Davies Ltd.
- A Man of Talent (1948): Peter Davies Ltd.
- The House on the Hill (1949), illustrated by Francis Gower: Peter Davies Ltd.
- Douce (1950): Peter Davies Ltd.
- The Provost's Jewel (1950), illustrated by Joy Colesworthy: Peter Davies Ltd.
- The Tontine Belle (1951): Peter Davies Ltd.
- The Lintowers (1951), illustrated by Joy Colesworthy: Peter Davies Ltd.
- Conor Sands (1952): Peter Davies Ltd.
- The Captain's House (1952), illustrated by Joy Colesworthy: Peter Davies [1977 edition illustrated by Cheslie D'Andrea and published by White Lion Publishers]
- Forgotten as a Dream (1953): Peter Davies Ltd.
- The Reiver's Road (1953), illustrated by A. H. Watson: Thomas Nelson (published in the United States of America as On Lennox Moor)
- The House of the Pelican (1954), illustrated by Peggy Fortnum: Thomas Nelson (children's novel set in Edinburgh at the Edinburgh Festival)
- The Regent's Candlesticks (1954)
- Caroline House (1955), illustrated by Robert Hodgson: Thomas Nelson
- A Stillness in the Air (1956): Peter Davies Ltd. (travel)
- Run to Earth (1957), illustrated by Mary Shillabeer: Thomas Nelson
- Maid of Orleans. The story of Joan of Arc (1957), illustrated by Robert Hodgson: Thomas Nelson
- Queen of Scots. The story of Mary Stuart (1957), illustrated by Robert Hodgson: Thomas Nelson
- The Other Miss Evans (1958): Peter Davies Ltd.
- The Money Cat (1958), illustrated by Cecil Leslie: Hamish Hamilton (children's book)
- Oh say, can you see (1959): Peter Davies Ltd. (travel)
- Eagles' Nest (1961), illustrated by Juliete Palmer: Nelson
- Girl with a Lantern (1961), illustrated by Douglas Relf: Nelson
- Girl with an Easel (1962), illustrated by Charles Mozley: Evans Bros (biography of Vigee Le Brun)
- Return to the Alcazar (1962): Peter Davies Ltd. (romance novel)
- Girl with a Pen. The story of Charlotte Brontë (1963), illustrated by Charles Mozley: Evans Bros
- Victoria; the story of a great queen (1964), illustrated by Annette Macarthur-Onslow: Thomas Nelson
- Girl with a Song; the story of Jenny Lind (1964), illustrated by Charles Mozley: Evans Bros
- Girl with a Destiny : the story of Mary of Orange (1965), illustrations by Charles Mozley: Evans Bros
- The Boy who Asked for More: the early life of Charles Dickens (1966): Evans Bros
- Love is for the Living (1966): Peter Davies Ltd.
- Duet: the story of Clara and Robert Schumann (1968): Evans Bros
- Queen's Evidence (1969): Peter Davies Ltd.
- Song of the Waterfall: the story of Edvard and Nina Grieg (1970): Evans Bros
- Mirror Dance (1970): Peter Davies Ltd. (novel for adults)
- The Scent of Danger (1971): Peter Davies Ltd.
- The Stilt Walkers (1972): Heinemann
- The Silver Pineapple (1972): Peter Davies Ltd.
- Through the Wall (1973), illustrated by Philip Moon: Heinemann
- The Heron Tree (1973): Peter Davies Ltd.
- High Season (1974): Peter Davies Ltd.
- Free as Air (1974): Peter Davies Ltd.
- Down the Water (1975) (novel for adults)
- The Key of the Castle (1976), illustrated by Joanna Troughton: Heinemann (children's historical novel)
- The Yellow Coach (1976), illustrated by Alexy Pendle: Heinemann (children's historical novel set in France)
- All the Nice Girls [c 1976]: Magna Print (novel for adults)
- The Burning Hill (1977): Magna Print (novel for adults)
- The Stark Inheritance (1978): Peter Davies Ltd.
- A Summer Scandal [c 1979]: Magna Print (novel for adults)
- The Deed Box (1981): Hale
- Bridge of the Blind Man (1983): Hale
