= The Dam Busters (book) =

1951 WWII book by Paul Brickhill

- First edition
- Author: Paul Brickhill
- Publisher: Evans Brothers
- Publication date: 1951

The Dam Busters is a 1951 non-fiction book by Paul Brickhill about Royal Air Force 617 Squadron originally commanded by Wing Commander Guy Gibson V.C. during World War II. The squadron became known as the "Dam Busters" because of Operation Chastise, a mission using highly specialised bombs to destroy Ruhr dams in Germany.

The book also covers the subsequent history of 617 Squadron, as an elite squadron specialising in attacking difficult targets with outsize weapons and precision techniques. Among Gibson's successors as commander was Group Captain Leonard Cheshire VC, and the book describes Cheshire's unorthodox leadership style and innovative target-marking techniques.

== Development ==
After the end of World War II John Nerney, head of the Air Historical Branch of the British Air Ministry identified the need for a history of 617 Squadron. He initially approached its former commanding officer Leonard Cheshire, who declined citing health issues and his work commitments running a hospice.

Cheshire recommended that McGowan Cradon be considered for the task. Cradon had served as intelligence officer with the squadron. in December 1946 Cradon was approached and agreed but his services were rejected by the RAF as senior officers questioned his commitment since, during the war, he had been too interested in flying on practice flights rather than attending to his duties.

Nerney then discussed the issue with John Pudney, who was an editor at News Review. Pudney had liked Paul Brickhill's book of World War II escape attempts Escape to Danger (which he had co-authored with Conrad Norton) and was at the time attempting to turn it into a series for BBC TV.

Following up Pudney's recommendation, Nerney approached Brickhill in February 1949, who jumped at the offer. As an officer and a pilot in the RAF and a proven writer and journalist Brickhill was acceptable provided he could obtain written confirmation from the RAAF of his service with the RAF. Eventually this was received in March 1949.

While doing all it could to assist his research the Air Ministry could only provided Brickhill with a small honorarium, and no guarantee of publication other than as a government produced publication. In an attempt to obtain an advance which would pay enough for him to leave his current job as a sub-editor at The Sun newspaper in Sydney, Australia and relocate to England Brickhill approached a number of Australian publishers to see if they were interested in an Australian edition of the book. None were interested so Brickhill was forced to decline Nerney's offer.

At the same time Brickhill had been approached by John Pudney who had recently joined London based publisher Evans Brothers as an editor with a proposal to write a book on the Stalag Luft 3 mass escape. This was eventually to be published as The Great Escape. With the advance that Evans Brothers offered Brickhill he left his job and sailed to England in May 1949.

Once in England he a wrote to Air Chief Marshall Sir Ralph Cochrane of the RAF who had been responsible for 617 Squadron during World War II and inquiring about the status of the proposed history offered his services if they were still required. His offer was accepted. Brickhill approached Evans Brothers about an advance for the Dam Busters book, but they were not interested in any advance until they had seen a manuscript. Already working on The Great Escape Brickhill also commenced simultaneous work on The Dam Busters.

While visiting Germany as part of his research for The Great Escape, Brickhill took the opportunity to visit the Ruhr valley to see the dams attacked during Operation Chastise.

While he was obliged to write a history of the squadron, Brickhill looked for a common factor throughout its wartime service that would make it more attractive to the general public. As the squadron had had a number of commanding officers including Guy Gibson, Harold Martin and Leonard Cheshire this was not helpful in maintaining the continuity of the narrative. Eventually he discovered that not only was Barnes Wallis involved with the squadron in developing the bouncing bombs used during Operation Chastise but he had also designed the Grand Slam and Tallboy bombs used by the squadron later in the war. After meeting with Wallis in the summer of 1950 he decided that here was the book's central figure, a driven man who overcame great odds set against the tragedy of the heavy losses that the squadron endured.

He delivered the draft manuscript to Evans Brothers at the end of 1950.

== Publication ==
The first (September 1951) edition did not include some of the details of the dam-raids, as these were still classified at the time, most significantly that the weapons bounced on the water surface before reaching the target. Later editions included these details. The book has remained continuously in print since then, selling over one million in its first 50 years. It was first released as a paperback by Pan in 1954. To coincide with the release of the film version it was serialised in the Evening News. A simplified version for children was issued in 1958 and in 1972 a version for teenage boys with reading difficulties was issued. Richard Todd narrated an audio version of the book in 1982.

== In other media ==
In 1954 a film The Dam Busters was made based on both Gibson's Enemy Coast Ahead (1946) and on Brickhill's book. Named after the latter, the movie starred Richard Todd as Gibson and Michael Redgrave as Wallis.

In 1954, Australasian Radio produced a radio dramatisation of the book in 26 half-hour episodes.
