= V. F. Perkins =

English film critic

Victor Francis Perkins (22 December 1936 – 15 July 2016), usually cited as V. F. Perkins, was an English film critic, best known for his work on film aesthetics and interpretation. He was born in Devon.

Perkins was a founder-editor of the journal Movie (1962–2000) and was employed as Teacher Adviser at the British Film Institute (BFI) before leaving to take up an academic post in 1968. He co-founded the film department at the University of Warwick in 1978, where he acted as a full time lecturer/senior lecturer until 2004.

Best known for his first book, Film as Film (1972), which quickly became a core text in Film Studies courses, Perkins influenced the way in which film is studied and became internationally known for his sharp intellect and jargon-less approach to the critical analysis of film. Perkins remained an active scholar until he died, continuing to lecture at Warwick University, as well as write and give papers on film analysis at home and abroad.

Perkins died on 15 July 2016, after suffering an aneurysm. Perkins married Tessa Pudney (daughter of the poet John Pudney) in the late 1960s Their son, Toby Perkins, is the Labour Member of Parliament for Chesterfield. Their daughter, Polly Vienna Perkins, is a writer and film producer.

== Select bibliography ==
- "The British Cinema" in MOVIE No.1, 1962
- "Why Preminger?" in MOVIE No. 4 (November 1962)
- "The Cinema of Nicholas Ray," MOVIE No. 9, May 1963., reprinted in Ian Cameron (ed.) Movie Reader, New York, 1972, and in Bill Nicholls (ed.), Movies and Methods Vol 1, California, 1976.
- "55 Days at Peking" in MOVIE No. 11.
- "Cheyenne Autumn" in MOVIE No. 12, Spring 1965.
- "Supporting the British Cinema" in MOVIE No. 16, Winter, 1968-1969.
- "America, America", MOVIE No. 19, Winter, 1971–1972
- Film as Film, Penguin Books, 1972.
- "Moments of Choice" in The Movie, ch. 58, reprinted in Ann Lloyd (ed.), Movie Book of the Fifties, Orbis, 1982.
- "Letter from an Unknown Woman" [on the Linz sequence] in MOVIE 29/30, Summer 1982
- "Must We Say What They Mean ? Film criticism and interpretation" in MOVIE No. 34, October 1990
- "Film Authorship - the premature burial" in CineAction, No. 21/22, November, 1990
- "In a Lonely Place" in Ian Cameron (ed.) The Movie Book of Film Noir, Studio Vista, 1992
- "Johnny Guitar", in Ian Cameron & Douglas Pye (eds.) The Movie Book of the Western, Studio Vista, 1996.
- The Magnificent Ambersons, British Film Institute, 1999.
- "Ophuls contra Wagner and Others" in MOVIE No 36, January 2000.
- "I Confess - Photographs of People Speaking" in CineAction No 52, September 2000.
- "'Same Tune Again!' - Repetition and Framing in Letter from an Unknown Woman " in CineAction No 52, September 2000.
- “Where is the world? The horizon of events in movie fiction” in John Gibbs and Douglas Pye (eds.) Style and meaning: studies in the detailed analysis of film, Manchester U.P., 2005.

For an in-depth examination of Perkins' career, see: Jeffrey Crouse, "Fueled by Enthusiasms: Jeffrey Crouse Interviews V. F. Perkins," Film International, 2004:3, pp. 14–27.
