= Paul Brickhill =

Australian author, WWII pilot and POW (1916–1991)

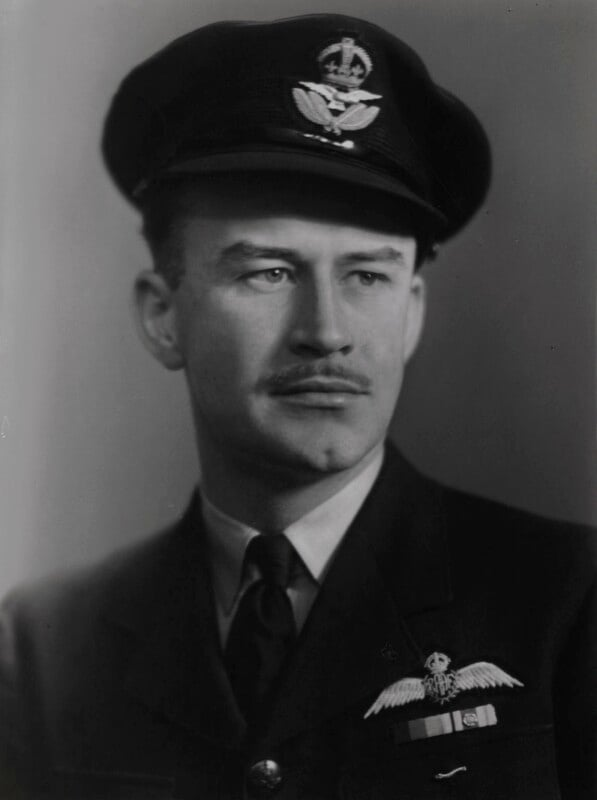
- Brickhill c. 1940s
- Born: Paul Chester Jerome Brickhill; 20 December 1916; Melbourne, Victoria, Australia
- Died: 23 April 1991 (aged 74); Sydney, New South Wales, Australia
- Spouses: Margot Slater (m. 1950; div. 1964)
- Children: 2
- Writing career
- Notable works: The Great Escape; The Dam Busters; Reach for the Sky

Paul Chester Jerome Brickhill (20 December 1916 – 23 April 1991) was an Australian fighter pilot, prisoner of war, and author who wrote The Great Escape, The Dam Busters, and Reach for the Sky.

== Early life ==
Brickhill was born in Melbourne, Victoria to journalist George Russell Brickhill (1879–1965) and Izitella Victoria (née Bradshaw) Brickhill (1885–1966). He was the third son of the couple's five children, the others being Russell (1911–2002), Ayde Geoffrey (1914–), Lloyd (1918–2011), and Clive (1923–2009). When Brickhill was 11 the family moved to Sydney, where he was educated at North Sydney Boys High School. A classmate, and friend, was actor Peter Finch.

Brickhill left school in 1931 after his father had been made redundant as a result of the Depression. While his other brothers continued with their education it was necessary for Brickhill, who was regarded as the least academic child, to get a job to assist his older brother Russell in bringing money into the family. He was sacked from his first two jobs due to his stutter. He then got a job as office boy and then lift boy at the Adelaide Steamship Company. That job did not last long, as Peter Finch, who was by then working as a copy boy, was able to convince a news editor at The Sun to interview Brickhill in 1932. Brickhill was hired as a copy boy, and within a year was promoted to cadet journalist. Within a few years he had worked his way up to journalist, and by 1940 was a sub-editor.

== World War II ==
Brickhill was unimpressed by war fever, until the shock of the invasion of France and subsequent withdrawal from Dunkirk, coupled with boredom with his deskbound sub-editor job, induced him to enlist on 6 January 1941 with the Royal Australian Air Force (RAAF). His flight training commenced in March 1941 at the Number 8 Elementary Flying Training School at Narrandera, New South Wales, under the Empire Air Training Scheme. Brickhill undertook advanced training as a fighter pilot in Canada and the United Kingdom before being assigned to No. 92 Squadron RAF, a unit equipped with Spitfires and part of the Desert Air Force in North Africa.

On 17 March 1943, on his 35th sortie, he was shot down over Tunisia, nearly dying as his parachute tangled on the cockpit door, then on landing dragged him 200 m across a minefield. Captured by Italian soldiers, he became a prisoner of war. He was flown to Italy on 23 March, then sent by train to Germany. After being held at the Dulag Luft at Oberursel, a central receiving and interrogation station for captured enemy airmen for the Luftwaffe, he was sent to Stalag Luft III, in Lower Silesia, 150 km southeast of Berlin, arriving there on 4 April 1943. Brickhill became involved with organizing the camp's escape, initially as a lookout or "stooge", before volunteering to work as a digger on the "Tom" tunnel. He developed claustrophobia, so he was put in charge of security for the forgers. Because of his claustrophobia and the risk that he would panic and block the escape of those behind him, he was not allowed to take part in the escape attempt, which is known as "The Great Escape".

Following the announcement of the murder of the escapees who had been recaptured following the Great Escape, Brickhill became determined to document the event. Discussing the subject with fellow prisoner Conrad Norton, they found that many of their fellow prisoners had other tales of daring escapes that would justify a book following the end of the war. As Brickhill had been involved in "The Great Escape", he concentrated on that story, while Norton collected individual tales. Since the prisoners were forbidden from writing anything other than letters and postcards, they collected every piece of paper they could find and, writing in as small a hand as possible, they collected stories and hid them from the guards.

== Return to journalism ==
Following the end of the war, while the terms of his enlistment with the RAAF had been that he had to serve for 12 months following the cessation of hostilities, Brickhill was granted six months' leave without pay. During his leave he returned to journalism, working as a London-based correspondent for Associated Newspapers. Meanwhile, outside of working hours he had typed up his and Norton's stories and selected David Higham as their literary agent. With Higham's help the manuscript was accepted by Faber & Faber and published as Escape to Danger in 1946.

After working for Associated Newspapers for a period, Brickhill returned to Australia, taking a job as a sub-editor at The Sun newspaper in Sydney, Australia.

Brickhill and Norton had agreed that each would retain the copyright to the chapters that they had written for Escape to Danger. As a result, while awaiting for sufficient stocks of paper to be obtained to print the book, Brickhill was able to sell a condensed version of his chapter on the Great Escape to several newspapers in Australia.

== The Great Escape and The Dam Busters ==
After the end of World War II, John Nerney, head of the Air Historical Branch of the British Air Ministry identified the need for a history of 617 Squadron. While trying to find a suitable author he discussed the issue with John Pudney, who was an editor at News Review. Pudney had liked Escape to Danger and suggested that Brickhill be considered.

Following up Pudney's recommendation, Nerney approached Brickhill in February 1949, who jumped at the offer. While doing all it could to assist his research the Air Ministry could only provide Brickhill with a small honorarium, and no guarantee of publication other than as a government produced publication. In an attempt to obtain an advance which would pay enough for him to leave his current job as a sub-editor at The Sun and relocate to England, Brickhill approached a number of Australian publishers to see if they were interested in an Australian edition of the book. None was interested, so Brickhill was forced to decline Nerney's offer.

At the same time Brickhill had been approached by John Pudney, who had recently joined London based publisher Evans Brothers as an editor, with a proposal to write a book on the Stalag Luft III mass escape. This was eventually to be published as The Great Escape. With the advance that Evans Brothers offered Brickhill, he left his job and sailed to England in May 1949.

Once in England, Brickhill asked the RAF about the status of the proposed history of 617 Squadron, offering his services if they were still required. As the RAF had made no further progress in finding an alternative author, his offer was accepted. Brickhill approached Evans Brothers about an advance for the proposed book on 617 Squadron, but they were not interested in providing any advance until they saw a manuscript. Already working on The Great Escape, Brickhill also commenced simultaneous work on the 617 Squadron history.

The Great Escape was published in 1950 and brought the incident to wide public attention.

The history of 617 Squadron and in particular its involvement in Operation Chastise and the destruction of dams in the Ruhr valley was published in 1951 as The Dam Busters, which sold over one million copies over 50 years.

Following the success of The Dam Busters, Robert Clark the head of production at Associated British Picture Corporation approached Brickhill about acquiring the screen rights to the book. The company's production manager was of the opinion that there were too many people and raids involved, and that they would not be able to film the book in its entirety. As a result, he requested that Brickhill provide a condensed film treatment. Brickhill agreed to do it without payment, in the hope of selling the screen rights. To assist, Clark teamed him up with Walter Mycroft who was the company's Director of Production. Brickhill decided to concentrate the film treatment on Operation Chastise, and ignore the later raids.

Associated agreed with Brickhill on the film rights in December 1952 for what is believed to have been £5,000.

The subsequent film was released in 1954 as The Dam Busters.

== Reach for the Sky ==
After reading The Dam Busters, Battle of Britain ace Douglas Bader approached Brickhill in 1951 about collaborating on his biography. Brickhill agreed to undertake the project.

Several publishers were approached about the proposed biography. Brickhill's agent found that William Collins and Sons offered the best terms, leading Brickhill to sign with them. However Brickhill felt guilty about not signing with John Pudney and Evans Brothers, who had previously been so supportive of him. He consequently offered to write an anthology of escape stories for them, eventually published as Escape – Or Die.

The biography of Bader was published in 1954 as Reach for the Sky. In the first few months alone, 172,000 copies were sold. The initial print run of 300,000 quickly sold out, and the biography became the best-selling hardback in post-war Britain.

The book was subsequently adapted for the screen and released in 1956 as a feature film. Starring Kenneth More as Bader, it topped the box office in Britain that year.

== Later life ==
Brickhill spent the rest of his life working on unfinished film screenplays, novels and biographies, but was unable to repeat his successes of 1949 to 1954.

In 1969 he returned to live permanently in Australia. Brickhill died in Sydney, New South Wales on 23 April 1991 aged 74.

== Personal life ==
After meeting on a ship from Australia to England in 1949, the 33-year-old Brickhill married 21-year-old Margot Slater, also an Australian, in St. Michael's Church, Chester Square, Pimlico on 22 April 1950. They divorced on 20 July 1964 after a tempestuous marriage. Margot later married Devon Minchin.

Paul and Margot Brickhill had two children: Timothy Paul (14 April 1954– ) and Tempe Melinda (August 1957– ). After working as a fashion model Tempe became manager of Issey Miyake London, CEO of Issey Miyake Europe and a director of Fédération Française de la Couture.

== Biographies about Brickhill ==
His life was the subject of a 2016 biography, The Hero Maker: A Biography of Paul Brickhill, by Stephen Dando-Collins and Flying into Danger: The Paul Brickhill Story by John Ramsland.

== Bibliography ==
Brickhill wrote the following books:

- Escape to Danger (with Conrad Norton). London: Faber and Faber, 1946.
- The Great Escape. New York: Norton, 1950.
- The Dam Busters. London: Evans, 1951.
- Escape – Or Die: Authentic Stories of the R.A.F. Escaping Society. London: Evans, 1952.
- Reach for the Sky: The Story of Douglas Bader DSO, DFC. London: Collins, 1954.
- The Deadline. London: Collins, 1962. (US title War of Nerves)

Reach for the Sky was included in the compilation Three Great Air Stories. London: Collins, 1970.

== Film adaptations ==
Three books by Brickhill were made into feature films: The Dam Busters (1955), Reach for the Sky (1956), and The Great Escape (1963).

Deadline became an episode of the Bob Hope Presents the Chrysler Theatre anthology series titled War of Nerves that was first broadcast on 5 January 1964.

== Sources ==
- "Brickhill, Paul Chester Jerome 1916–1991." Contemporary Authors, New Revision Series, 69: 68–69.
- Dando-Collins, Stephen (2016). The Hero Maker: A Biography of Paul Brickhill (Paperback). Sydney: Penguin Random House Australia. ISBN 978-0-85798-812-6.
- Mackenzie, S. P. (2008). Bader's War. London: Spellmount Publishers. ISBN 978-0-7524-5534-1.
- Ramsden, John (2003). The Dam Busters: A British Film Guide (Paperback). London: I.N. Tauris & Co. ISBN 1-86064-636-0.
- Ramsland, John (2016). Flying Into Danger: The Paul Brickhill Story (Paperback). Carlton, Australia: Brolga Publishing. ISBN 978-1-92536-768-3.
