= Douglas Relf =

English artist and illustrator (1907–1970)

Douglas Rupert Relf (November 1907 – April 1970) was a British artist who became well known for his work for the British Railways Western Region, and for his illustrations and dust jackets for many children's books from multiple publishers in the 1950s and 1960s.

Relf was born at Prittlewell, Westcliff-on-Sea, Essex, the son of a civil servant. He began his artistic career as a painter of landscapes, still life and portraits, working mostly in oils. He exhibited at the Royal Academy 14 times between 1935 and 1950. His work was also shown at the Royal Society of British Artists and the Royal Institute of Oil Painters. He was a member of the Art Workers' Guild from 1946.

Relf was living in south-east London in the 1930s, and married his wife Eironwy in Lewisham in 1935, exhibiting a small portrait of her at the Royal Academy exhibition. The couple then moved to Mill House, Hatfield Peverel, near Braintree in Essex, where he began painting local scenes and local people. He served in the Royal Air Force during the war. At this period his work was regularly featured in the annual Royal Academy exhibitions in London, and in 1949 fourteen of his paintings were exhibited at J H Clarke & Co in Chelmsford, including several Essex scenes, still life compositions and two studies of his small son David.

From the late 1940s, Relf forged a new career as a commercial artist, starting with railway posters. Examples include posters illustrating Cheltenham Spa and Paignton. They are included in the collections of the National Railway Museum in York and the Science Museum in London. In the early 1950s Relf moved to Great Chart, near Ashford in Kent, where he mainly produced illustrations for children's adventure stories, a mix of paintings in oil for the dust jackets and black and white line drawings for the inside. He died in April 1970, aged 62.

== Selected book cover illustrations ==
- Marion Campbell: The Squire of Val, J M Dent (1964)
- Douglas Castle: The Brotherhood of the Tortoise, Blackie & Son (1952)
- Eric Crozier: The Life and Legends of Saint Nicolas, Duckworth (1949)
- Douglas Duff: Port of Missing Ships, Thomas Nelson (1959)
- Gladys May Durant: Fires of Revolt (1957)
- Michael Elder: The Affair at Invergarroch, Adam and Charles Black (1950)
- George E Evans: The Fitton Four Poster, Blackie & Son (1950)
- David Gammon: Pacific Plunder, Thomas Nelson (1959)
- Capt. W E Johns: Adventure Unlimited, Thomas Nelson (1957)
- Elisabeth Kyle: Girl with a Lantern, Evans Brothers (1961)
- Jane Lane: The March of the Prince, Evans Brothers (1965)
- John Marsh: The Young Winston Churchill, Evans Brothers (1955)
- Eric Leyland: Indian Range, Brockhampton Press (1953)
- Angus MacVicar: The Kersivay Kraken, Harrap (1966)
- Stephen Mogridge: Merlin's House, Thomas Nelson (1963)
- John Pudney: Adventure series (1950s and 1960s)
- George L Procter: Greenland Adventure, Harrap (1950)
- Martha Robinson: The Vet's Nieces, Harrap (1967)
- Anna Sewell: Black Beauty, Nelson Classics (1949)
- R. C. Sherriff: King John's Treasure, Macmillan (1954)
- Rosemary Sutcliff: Bridge Builders, Blackwell (1960)
- John Sweet: The Secret of Rumbling Churn (1950)
- Peter Wickloe: With the Knights of Malta, Blackie & Son (1952)
