= John Pudney =

British poet, journalist and author (1909–1977)

John Sleigh Pudney (19 January 1909 – 10 November 1977) was a British poet, journalist and author. He was known especially for his popular poetry written during the Second World War, but he also wrote novels, short stories and children's fiction. His broad-ranging non-fiction, often commissioned, served as his primary source of income.

== Early life and career ==
John Pudney was born at Langley Marish, the only son of Henry William Pudney, a farmer and countryman, and Mabel Sleigh Pudney. He was educated at Gresham's School, Holt, where he first encountered W. H. Auden, Benjamin Britten, and Humphrey Spender. He left school in 1925 at the age of sixteen, and spent several years working as an estate agent and studying to become a surveyor. However, he also began contributing articles to the News Chronicle while writing short stories and channelling his love of the countryside into verse. At the time he was one of a group of young writers, including Dylan Thomas, George Barker and David Gascoyne, that gathered about the well-known bookshop at No 4, Parton Street near London's Red Lion Square, run by David Archer.

His first published collection of verse, Spring Encounter, came out in 1933 from Methuen and gained the attention of Lady Ottoline Morrell who became a patron. Pudney also wrote for The Listener and worked as a producer at the BBC, where he produced the radio play Hadrian's Wall with text by Auden and music by Britten; it was broadcast from Newcastle on 25 November 1937. While at the BBC he also wrote one of the first plays for television, Edna's Fruit Hat, which was broadcast on 27 January 1939. His first novel, Jacobson's Ladder, describing literary and criminal life in 1930s Soho, appeared in 1938.

== War poetry ==
It was the advent of the Second World War that enabled Pudney to find his subject, the effect that war has on the lives of ordinary people, and with it his audience. In 1940 he was commissioned into the Royal Air Force as an intelligence officer and as a member of the Air Ministry's Creative Writers Unit, a noncombatant role. It was while he was serving as squadron intelligence officer at RAF St Eval in Cornwall that he wrote one of the best-known poems of the war. For Johnny evoked popular fellow-feeling in the London of 1941. Written during an air raid, it was published first in the News Chronicle and (with Missing, another poem by Pudney) later featured significantly in the film The Way to the Stars.

Two poems supposedly written by one of the main characters, Squadron Leader David Archdale, are used in The Way to the Stars. Archdale is portrayed reciting Missing to his wife shortly before their marriage, after a close friend is killed in action. Archdale tells his wife that "I try and say things I feel that way sometimes. Sort of hobby" and tells her she's the only one who knows he writes poetry.

Missing

Less said the better.
The bill unpaid, the dead letter,
No roses at the end,
Of Smith, my friend.

Last words don't matter,
And there are none to flatter
Words will not fill the post
Of Smith, the ghost.

For Smith, our brother,
Only son of loving mother,
The ocean lifted, stirred
Leaving no word.

For Johnny is depicted in The Way to the Stars as having been found by a close friend on a piece of paper after David Archdale's death on a raid. He gives it to Archdale's widow, who later in the film gives it to an American flyer to read after another American friend of hers is killed.

For Johnny

Do not despair
For Johnny-head-in-air;
He sleeps as sound
As Johnny underground.

Fetch out no shroud
For Johnny-in-the-cloud;
And keep your tears
For him in after years.

Better by far
For Johnny-the-bright-star,
To keep your head
And see his children fed.

Pudney published several collections of poetry during the war, including Dispersal Point (1942) and South of Forty (1943), the latter describing his experiences in North Africa. Both collections sold over 250,000 copies between them. One contemporary reviewer noted that the poems were "immediately topical and intended to reach a less poetically sophisticated audience", and that they showed "how completely he has succeeded in combining the journalist and the poet. That is no easy matter, for the one usually swamps the other".

== Later career ==
In the general election of July 1945, Pudney stood as the Labour Party candidate for Sevenoaks, polling 14,947 votes, or 36%. (The sitting Conservative MP Charles Ponsonby was re-elected, with 46% of the vote.)

After the war, he continued to write and worked as a journalist and editor. He was the book critic for the Daily Express from 1945 and with the News Review from 1948 to 1950. He then shifted into publishing, as a director and literary adviser to Evans Brothers, Ltd (1950–1953) and Putnam & Co Ltd (1953–1963). At Evans, Pudney bolstered the company's long-standing children's catalogue with his own boys adventures, the 11 volume 'Fred and I' series (Monday Adventure, Spring Adventure etc.). One of them, Thursday Adventure (1955) was filmed as The Stolen Airliner (1955). They featured classic front cover and internal illustrations by artists such as Ley Kenyon and Douglas Relf. The later six volumes of Hartwarp adventures for younger children were published by Hamish Hamilton. Both series were popular and sold well in the 1950s and 1960s, but they have gone out of print.

More significantly, while at Evans Pudney commissioned the Australian fighter pilot and prisoner-of-war Paul Brickhill to come to England and write The Great Escape, which Evans published in 1950; it attracted much attention. He had suggested to the Air Historical Branch of the British Air Ministry that Brickhill should be considered as the author of a history of 617 Squadron. After the success of The Great Escape, it was also published by Evans as The Dam Busters (1951), which sold over one million copies in its first 50 years.

Of his own novels, The Net (1952, set in an aeronautical research station) and Thin Air (1961, a thriller describing the community of a new industrial town in the Thames Valley) were well received. The Net was filmed by director Anthony Asquith in 1953. The same year Pudney wrote the script for the documentary Elizabeth is Queen for Associated British Pathé, which received a BAFTA award. Between 1949 and 1963, he edited an annual anthology called Pick of Today's Short Stories. Commissioned non-fiction (particularly aeronautical) became an important source of income for Pudney in his later years. Among these works were a history of the British state airline B.O.A.C. (The Seven Skies, 1959), and of Courage Brewery (A Draught of Contentment (1971).

However, poetry remained the most important to him. His later work, from the collection Spill Out (1967) onward, took on a more ironic stance but was still vernacular, rather than academic, a period reflected in his second Selected Poems collection of 1973. One of his book blurbs describes him as "a poet who just missed being an intellectual". His final two poems appeared in the Times Literary Supplement a few days after his death.

== Personal life ==
On 30 October 1934, Pudney married the Fabian feminist Crystal Selwyn Herbert (1915–1999), the daughter of A. P. Herbert, a writer and independent Member of Parliament. They first lived in Cornwall in a converted lifeboat, then took a farm in Essex. There were two daughters and a son. They divorced in 1955, and Pudney immediately married his second wife, Monica Forbes Curtis of the Forbes family. She helped him recover from his alcoholism, to which he publicly confessed in 1965 and emerged cured in 1967 – despite a hit-and-run accident in the middle that broke both his legs and dislocated his shoulder. The recovery process became a subject for his writing. According to Michael White Spill Out was written "half of it on the booze and half off, and he didn't remember which half was which". In 1976, Pudney developed cancer of the throat from which he died nearly two years later in much pain. He wrote about his illness unflinchingly in his autobiographical Thank Goodness for Cake, posthumously published in 1978.

John Pudney's daughter Tessa (1942–2004) was an academic best known for her work in media studies at Sheffield Hallam University. She married the film critic Victor Perkins in the 1960s. Their son, Toby Perkins, is the Labour Member of Parliament for Chesterfield.

== List of works ==
Poetry

- Spring Encounter (1933)
- Open the Sky (Boriswood 1934)
- Dispersal Point and other Air Poems (1942)
- The Grass Grew All Round (1942)
- Beyond This Disregard (1943)
- South of Forty (1943)
- Ten Summers: Poems 1933–1943 (1944)
- Almanack of Hope: Sonnets (1944)
- Air Force Poetry (1944) (anthology, edited with Henry Treece)
- Flight above Cloud (1944)
- World Still There (1945)
- Selected Poems (1946)
- Low Life (1947)
- Commemorations (1948)
- Sixpenny Songs (1953)
- Collected Poems (1957)
- The Trampoline (1959)
- Spill Out: Poems and Ballads (1967)
- Spandrels: Poems and Ballads (1969)
- Take This Orange: Poems and Ballads (1971)
- Selected Poems 1967–1973 (1973)
- Living in a One-Sided House (1976)
- Writers' Workshop, poetry anthology publication, editor with Norman Hidden and Michael Johnson (from 1967)

Novels

- Jacobson's Ladder (1938)
- Estuary, a Romance (1947)
- Shuffley Wanderers (1948)
- The Accomplice (1950)
- Hero of a Summer's Day (1951)
- The Net (1952)
- A Ring for Luck (1953)
- Trespass in the Sun (1957)
- Thin Air (1961)
- Tunnel to the Sky (1965)
- The Long Time Growing Up (1971)

Short stories

- And Lastly the Fireworks (Boriswood 1935)
- Uncle Arthur and other stories (1939)
- Edna's Fruit Hat (1946)
- It Breathed Down My Neck (1946) (selected short stories)
- The Europeans: Fourteen tales of a Continent (1948)
- The Pick of Today's Short Stories, 14 volumes (1949–1963), anthologies, editor

For Children

- Saturday Adventure (1950) "a story for boys"
- Sunday Adventure (1951)
- Monday Adventure: The Secrets of Blackmead Abbey (1952)
- Tuesday Adventure: The Affray in the Sardanger Fjord (1953)
- Wednesday Adventure (1954)
- Thursday Adventure: The Stolen Airliner (1955)
- Friday Adventure (1956)
- The Grandfather Clock (1957)
- Crossing the Road (1958)
- Spring Adventure (1961)
- Summer Adventure (1962)
- The Hartwarp Light Railway (1962)
- The Hartwarp Balloon (1963)
- The Hartwarp Circus (1963)
- The Hartwarp Bakehouse (1964)
- Autumn Adventure (1964)
- The Hartwarp Explosion (1965)
- Winter Adventure (1965)
- The Hartwarp Jets (1967)

Autobiographical

- The Green Grass Grew All Round (1942)
- Who Only England Know (1943)
- Home & Away – An Autobiographical Gambit (1960)
- Thank Goodness for Cake (1978)

Non fiction

- The Air Battle of Malta (1944) (HMSO Information Books)
- Atlantic Bridge (1945) (HMSO Information Books)
- World Still There (1945)
- Laboratory of the Air:The Royal Aircraft Establishment, Farnborough (1948) (HMSO)
- Music on the South Bank: An Appreciation of The Royal Festival Hall (1951)
- His Majesty King George VI (1952)
- The Thomas Cook Story (1953)
- The Queen's People (1953), photographs by Izis Bidermanas
- The Smallest Room: a Discreet Survey Through the Ages (1954)
- Six Great Aviators (1955)
- The Book of Leisure (1957) editor
- The Leisure-Hour Companion (1959)
- The Seven Skies (1959), history of B.O.A.C.
- A Pride of Unicorns: Richard and David Atcherley of the R.A.F. (1960)
- Bristol Fashion. Some Account of the Earlier Days of Bristol Aviation (1960)
- The Camel Fighter (1964)
- The Golden Age of Steam (1967)
- Flight and Flying (1968) editor
- Suez: De Lesseps' Canal (1968)
- A Draught of Contentment. The Story of the Courage Group.(1971)
- Crossing London's River: the Bridges, Ferries and Tunnels Crossing the Thames Tideway in London (1972)
- Brunel and His World (1974)
- London's Docks (1975)
- Lewis Carroll and His World (1976)
- John Wesley and His World (1978)
