= Dean and Dawson =

Travel agency in the United Kingdom

Dean and Dawson was a travel agency in the United Kingdom.

== History ==
Dean and Dawson was founded in 1871 by Joseph Dean and John Dawson. In 1890, Dean founded a printing company to support the travel agency.

In 1944, in the great escape from Stalag Luft III, the name Dean and Dawson was used as a code name by the forgers who produced counterfeit documents for the escaping prisoners of war, detailed in the book The Great Escape.

In the 1950s, the company was acquired by Thomas Cook Group.
