= The Net (1953 film) =

1953 film by Anthony Asquith

- Theatrical release poster
- Directed by: Anthony Asquith
- Written by: William Fairchild
- Based on: The Net by John Pudney
- Produced by: Antony Darnborough
- Starring: James Donald; Phyllis Calvert; Robert Beatty; Herbert Lom
- Cinematography: Desmond Dickinson
- Edited by: Frederick Wilson
- Music by: Benjamin Frankel
- Production company: Two Cities Films
- Distributed by: General Film Distributors
- Release dates: 10 February 1953 (UK); 5 November 1953 (U.S.)
- Running time: 86 minutes
- Country: United Kingdom
- Language: English

The Net (a.k.a. Project M7 (U.S. distribution)) is a 1953 British aviation thriller film made by Two Cities Films, directed by Anthony Asquith and starring James Donald, Phyllis Calvert, Robert Beatty and Herbert Lom. The film is set in the world of aviation research and was based on the 1952 novel of the same name by John Pudney. (Note: Some reference sources erroneously refer to the project as X7 or X-7.)

VHS

== Plot ==
At "Port Amberley", a secret aviation research station somewhere in England, a multinational group of scientists is working on the prototype of a revolutionary new aircraft, a supersonic nuclear-augmented jet aircraft code-named M7, taking off and landing on water (Note: During the 1950s, jet-powered floatplanes such as the Saunders-Roe SR.A/1, the Convair Sea Dart and the Beriev Be-10 were in the forefront of aviation research.) and capable of flying at up to 2,000 miles per hour. The project is intended to lead to M8, a spacecraft to explore space.

The atmosphere at the laboratory is competitive rather than co-operative, with rivalry between the various scientists. The project leader Michael Heathley is so wrapped up with the M7 that his wife Lydia feels neglected and that she is being sidelined in favour of her husband's work. At a social gathering, she strikes up a conversation with Heathley's colleague Alex Leon, and the pair are soon circling one another.

Meanwhile, Heathley is desperate to test the M7, but is over-ruled by facility director Carrington. The M7 is finally given its first test flight, and a perilous situation is only just survived. The group continue to work on modifications to iron out minor problems identified on the test flight. Matters take a sinister turn when Carrington dies after an accident. Meanwhile, the project's security members strongly suspect there is a spy in their midst and deploy agents to follow the scientists when away from the station.

The finished version of the M7 then takes to the sky, along with the spy who has talked his way on board. The spy tries to hijack the aircraft, but is foiled by pilot Heathley.

== Cast ==
- James Donald as Michael Heathley
- Phyllis Calvert as Lydia Heathley
- Robert Beatty as Sam Seagram
- Herbert Lom as Alex Leon
- Noel Willman as Dennis Bord
- Maurice Denham as Carrington
- Muriel Pavlow as Caroline Cartier
- Walter Fitzgerald as Sir Charles Craddock
- Patric Doonan as Brian Jackson
- Marjorie Fielding as Mother Heathley
- Herbert Lomas as George Jackson
- Cyril Chamberlain as Inspector Carter
- Hal Osmond as Agent Lawson
- Marianne Stone as Maisie
- Geoffrey Denton as Fisher

== Music ==
In 2006 the film's music was released on a CD Album along with the music from the films The Curse of the Werewolf, So Long at the Fair and The Prisoner.

== Production ==
Although The Net deals with contemporary aviation technology, there are no aircraft to be seen, other than photographs on walls and a model of the top-secret delta-wing M7 aircraft. At one point, the aircraft is seen resting on water, giving it the potential of being a flying-boat. All the interiors of the M7 are studio-constructed mock-ups.

At least one take-off from water of the M7 is shown using special effects. The waterborne segment simply shows the increasing slipstream effect on water to the rear of the craft as it increases speed, with no view of the M7 itself. The airborne segment is viewed from several ground locations showing either the M7 zooming overhead or the M7's shadow.

== Reception ==
Aviation historian Michael Paris, in From the Wright Brothers to Top Gun: Aviation, Nationalism, and Popular Cinema (1995), was positive in his review of the film. "The Net is essentially a thriller owing a great deal to contemporary Cold War tensions, but interestingly, it still pays homage to the notion of progress and utopianism through aviation and suggests that Britain is in the forefront of space research."

In Aviation in the Cinema (1985), aviation film historian Stephen Pendo, however, considered The Net, "... a poor effort; its only distinction is that it was the first aviation film to be photographed in Technicolor 3 D." In fact, The Net was photographed in black-and-white and was not in 3-D.
