= The Net (novel) =

1952 novel

- First edition
- Author: John Pudney
- Language: English
- Genre: Thriller
- Publisher: Michael Joseph
- Publication date: 1952
- Publication place: United Kingdom
- Media type: Print

The Net is a 1952 thriller novel by the British writer John Pudney.

== Synopsis ==
At an isolated, secret research centre a group of scientists work on a prototype new aircraft, but feel the strains of their tight confinement.

== Film adaptation ==
In 1953 it was made into a British film of the same title directed by Anthony Asquith and starring James Donald, Phyllis Calvert and Herbert Lom.

== Bibliography ==
- Goble, Alan. The Complete Index to Literary Sources in Film. Walter de Gruyter, 1999.
- Hammond, Andrew. Cold War Stories: British Dystopian Fiction, 1945-1990. Springer, 2017.
- Ryall, Tom. Anthony Asquith. Oxford University Press, 2013.
