= Toby Perkins =

British Labour politician

Toby Perkins MP
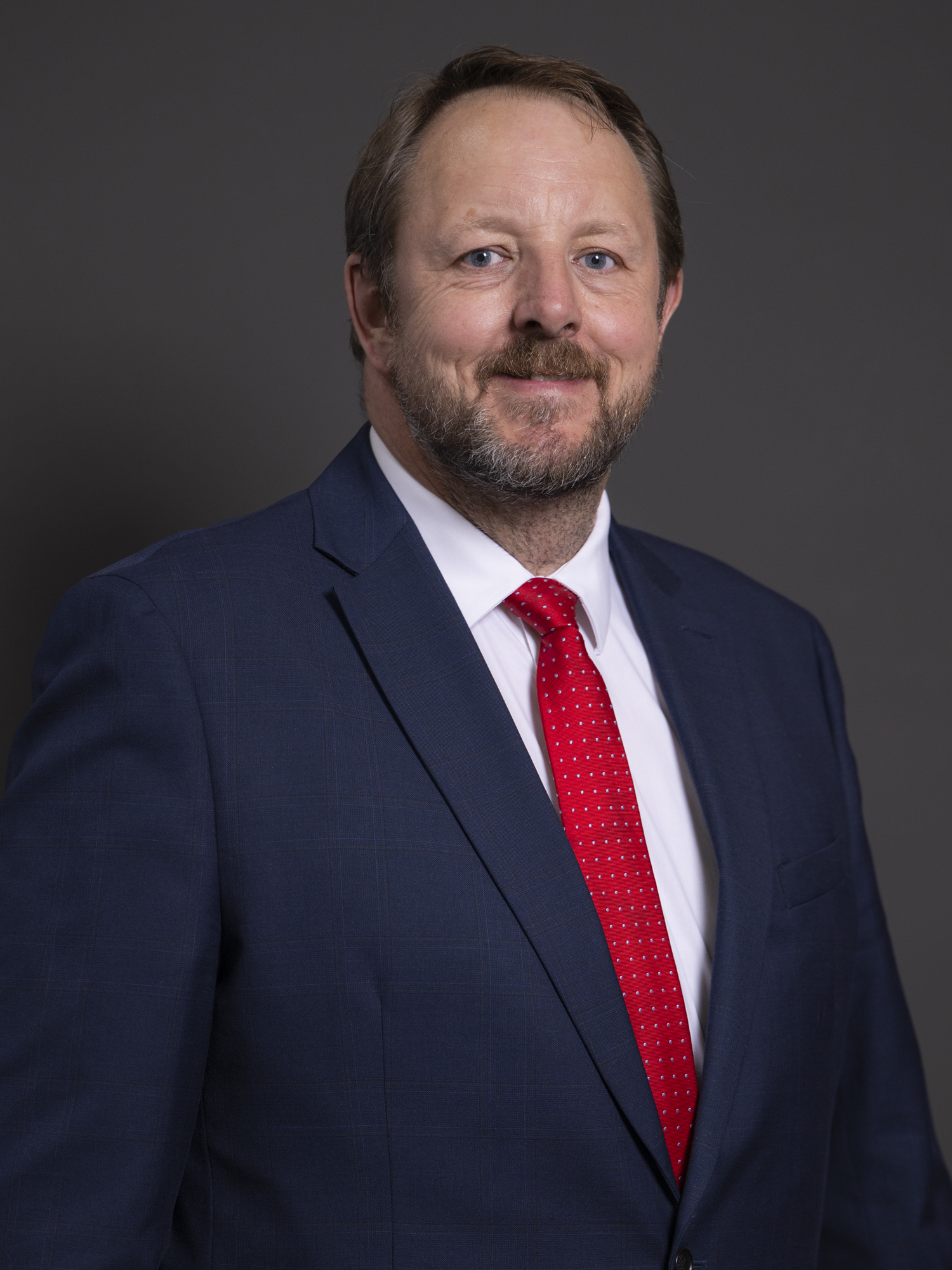
- Official portrait, 2025

Chair of the Environmental Audit Select Committee
- Incumbent
- Assumed office 11 September 2024
- Preceded by: Philip Dunne

Shadow Minister for Rural Affairs
- In office 5 September 2023 – 5 July 2024
- Leader: Keir Starmer
- Preceded by: Office established
- Succeeded by: Vacant

Shadow Minister for Apprenticeships and Lifelong Learning
- In office 9 April 2020 – 5 September 2023
- Leader: Keir Starmer
- Preceded by: Position established
- Succeeded by: Seema Malhotra

Shadow Minister for the Armed Forces
- In office 14 September 2015 – 27 June 2016
- Leader: Jeremy Corbyn
- Preceded by: Alison Seabeck
- Succeeded by: Wayne David

Shadow Minister for Small Business
- In office 7 October 2011 – 14 September 2015
- Leader: Ed Miliband
- Preceded by: Chuka Umunna
- Succeeded by: Bill Esterson

Member of Parliament for Chesterfield
- Incumbent
- Assumed office 6 May 2010
- Preceded by: Paul Holmes
- Majority: 10,820 (26.1%)

Personal details
- Born: 12 August 1970 (age 56) Reading, Berkshire, England
- Party: Labour
- Children: 2
- Occupation: Politician
- Website: www.tobyperkins.org.uk

Matthew Toby Perkins (born 12 August 1970) is a British Labour Party politician who has served as the Member of Parliament (MP) for Chesterfield since 2010. He was elected as chair of the Environmental Audit Select Committee in September 2024.

== Early life and career ==
Matthew Perkins was born on 12 August 1970 in Reading. He is the son of V. F. Perkins and Tessa Pudney (daughter of the poet John Pudney). He has a sister, Polly. He is a grandson of the poet John Pudney and a great-grandson of A. P. Herbert, Independent Member of Parliament for Oxford University (1935–1950). Perkins attended Trinity Catholic School in Leamington Spa, and Silverdale Comprehensive School in Sheffield. He worked in the private sector from 1987 until he was elected to Parliament in 2010. He was in IT Sales as a consultant and Regional Manager for the Prime Time Recruitment organisation, and subsequently set up a rugby product business. Perkins was a councillor for Rother Ward on Chesterfield Borough Council from 2003 to 2011.

== Parliamentary career ==
At the 2010 general election, Perkins was elected as MP for Chesterfield, defeating the incumbent Liberal Democrat Paul Holmes, and winning with 39% of the vote and a majority of 549. Following Perkins' election to Parliament in 2010, he asked a question in David Cameron's first Prime Minister's Questions as Prime Minister and was named by the Financial Times as one of the best six newcomers of the first 100 days of the 2010 parliament.

He backed David Miliband for the Labour leadership. Under Ed Miliband, Perkins became the first of the 2010 intake of new members to speak from the front bench when becoming a Shadow Education Minister in September 2010 under Andy Burnham. He was moved into the Shadow Business team as Shadow Minister for Enterprise and Small Business in 2011, under Chuka Umunna. As Shadow Business Minister he was responsible for Labour's policies on Access to Finance, Small Businesses, Regulation and de-regulation, Insolvency, Procurement, Pubs and the High Street.

In July 2014, Douglas Alexander appointed Perkins one of three Labour Party Deputy Chairs for the 2015 general election campaign, alongside Gloria De Piero and Jonathan Ashworth. He had previously run Labour's by-election campaign in Wythenshawe and Sale East. He also worked on by-election campaigns in Corby, Bradford West and Eastleigh.

At the 2015 general election, Perkins was re-elected as the MP for Chesterfield with an increased vote share of 47.9% and an increased majority of 13,598.

Perkins belongs to Labour Friends of Israel and Labour Friends of Palestine and the Middle East. He is the current chair of the All Party Parliamentary Pub Group, the All Party Parliamentary group on Tennis and was chair of the Labour Friends of the Forces from January 2016 to October 2020.

In Parliament Perkins has led Opposition Day debates for Labour on pub company regulation, Sunday trading laws for the Olympics, and on the Deregulation Bill alongside Chi Onwurah. He has secured adjournment debates against Derbyshire fire station closures, which led to a U-turn on plans to close 18 Derbyshire fire stations, and against the sale of legal highs.

Perkins proposed in 2016, via a 10-minute private members' bill, that "God Save the Queen" should cease to be the anthem used by English teams at international sporting fixtures. The second reading was due for 4 March, but was cancelled.

Perkins was Shadow Minister for the Armed Forces in the Shadow Cabinet of Jeremy Corbyn. However, he resigned on 27 June 2016, along with many of his colleagues. He then supported Owen Smith in the failed attempt to replace Jeremy Corbyn in the 2016 Labour leadership election. He nominated Keir Starmer in the 2020 Labour Party leadership contest.

He campaigned for the UK to remain a member of the European Union ahead of the EU Referendum on 23 June 2016.

In October 2016, Perkins supported the Saudi-led intervention in the Yemeni civil war against the Shia Houthis.

At the 2017 general election, Perkins was again re-elected, with an increased vote share of 54.8% and a decreased majority of 9,605. He was again re-elected at the 2019 general election, with a decreased vote share of 40.2% and a decreased majority of 1,451.

In April 2020, Perkins was appointed as Shadow Minister for Apprenticeships and Lifelong Learning by new party leader Keir Starmer. In the 2023 British shadow cabinet reshuffle, he became Shadow Minister for Rural Affairs.

Perkins was again re-elected at the 2024 general election, with an increased vote share of 46.5% and an increased majority of 10,820.

On 11 September 2024, Perkins was elected as chair of the Environmental Audit Select Committee.

== Personal life ==
Perkins was married in 1996 and separated in 2018, after it was revealed he had been having an affair with his aide, Amanda Collumbine, whom he has lived with in Chesterfield, Derbyshire since January 2019.

Parliament of the United Kingdom
Preceded by Paul Holmes	Member of Parliament for Chesterfield; 2010–present	Incumbent
