= Möhne Reservoir =

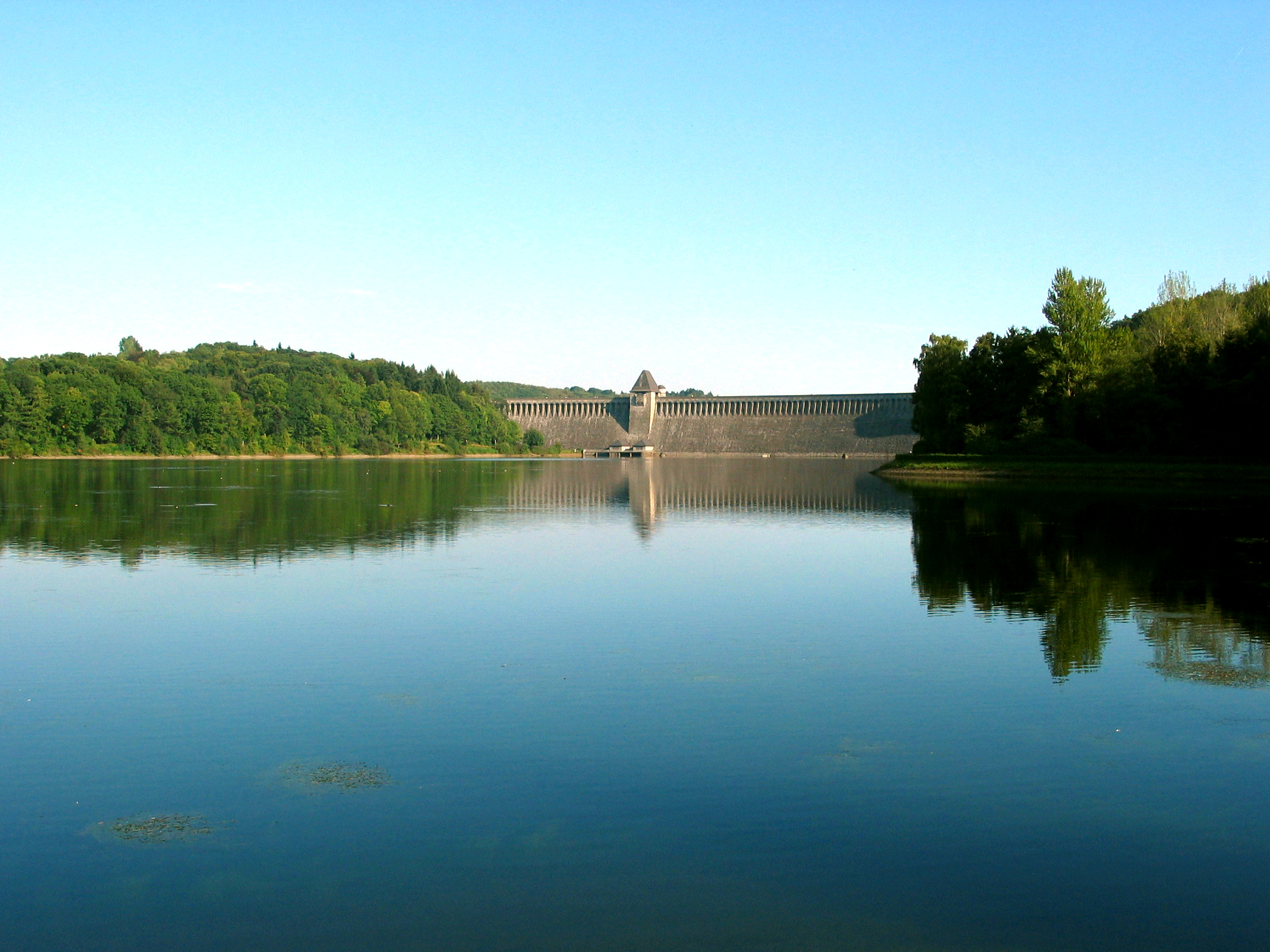
- The dam of the reservoir

- Location within North Rhine-Westphalia
- Coordinates: 51°29′00″N 8°04′18″E
- Type: artificial lake
- Primary inflows: Möhne, Heve
- Primary outflows: Möhne
- Catchment area: 432 km^{2} (167 sq mi)
- Basin countries: Germany
- Surface area: 1,067 ha (2,640 acres)
- Water volume: 135×10^{6} m^{3} (4.8×10^{9} cu ft)

The Möhne Reservoir (German: Möhnesee, pronounced [ˈmøːnəˌzeː]), or Moehne Reservoir, is an artificial lake in North Rhine-Westphalia, some 45 km east of Dortmund, Germany. The lake is formed by the damming of two rivers, the Möhne and Heve, and with its four basins stores as much as 135 million cubic metres of water.

== History ==
=== Construction and inauguration ===
In 1904, calculations about the future demand for water for people and industry in the growing Ruhr-area determined that the existing storage volume of 32.4 million m³ in dams of the Ruhr river system needed tripling. Thus, on 28 November 1904, the general assembly of the Ruhrtalsperreverein decided to construct additional dams. During 1908 to 1912 they built the Möhnetalsperre at a cost of 23.5 million marks.

When opened, the dam was the largest dam in Europe. 140 homesteads with 700 people had to move. It was built to help control floods, regulate water levels on the Ruhr river downstream, and generate hydropower. Today, the lake is also a tourist attraction.

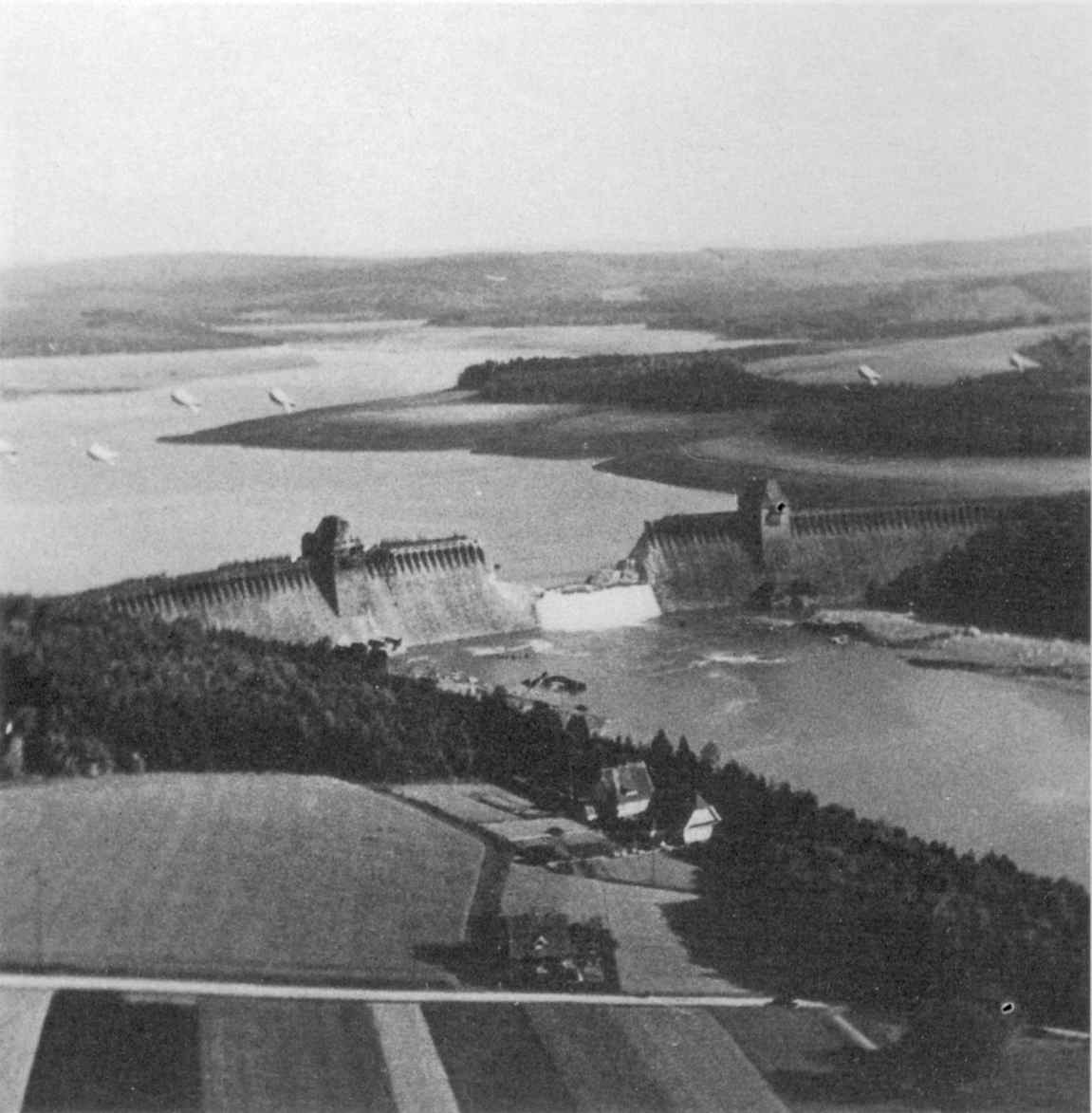
The breached Möhne Dam after the bombing

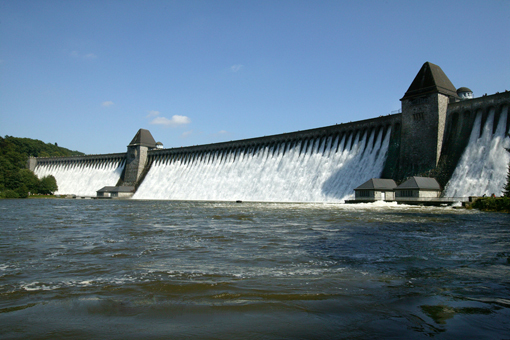
The dam in overflow

=== Second World War ===
The dam (51.489307°N 8.058772°E) was breached by RAF Lancaster Bombers ("The Dambusters") during Operation Chastise on the night of 16–17 May 1943, together with the Edersee dam in northern Hesse. Bouncing bombs had been developed which were able to skip over the protective nets that hung in the water. A 77 m by 22 m hole was blown in the dam with the resulting floodwave killing at least 1,579 people, 1,026 of them foreign forced labourers held in camps downriver. The small city of Neheim-Hüsten was particularly hard-hit, with over 800 victims, among them at least 526 victims in a camp for Russian women held for forced labour.

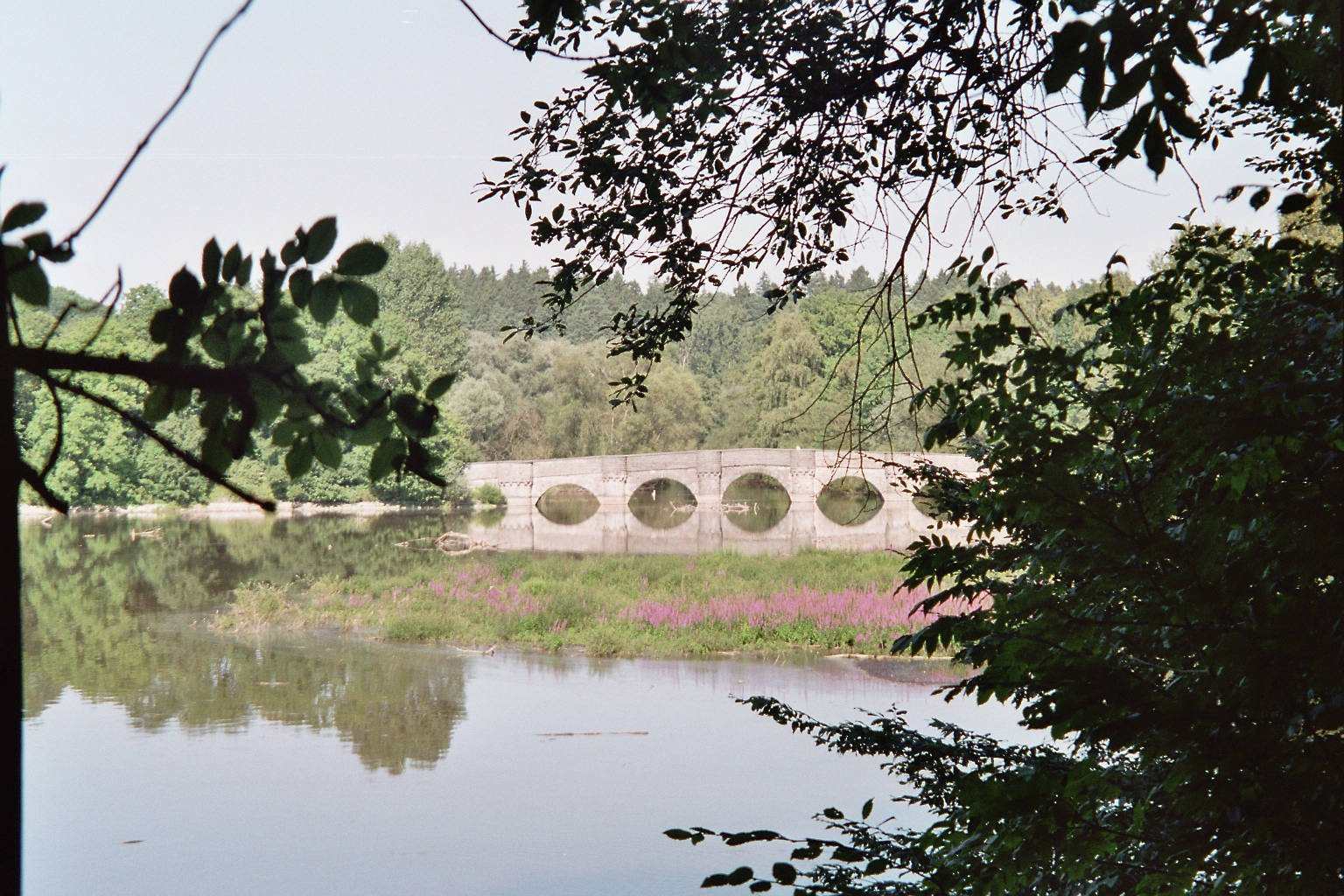
Kanzelbrücke at the beginning of the reservoir

Though the Organisation Todt quickly repaired the dams through the labour of 7,000 men taken from the construction of the Atlantic Wall, the impact of the raid on German industry in the Ruhr valley and on the civil population was significant. According to Albert Speer, "the power plant at the foot of the shattered dam looked as if it had been erased, along with its heavy turbines." "Industry was brought to a standstill", due to the "electrical installations being soaked and muddied."

Three other reservoirs were still intact, though the largest, the Sorpe Dam, had a hole above the water line. Another destroyed dam, the Edersee Dam, "had nothing to do with the supply of water to the Ruhr." The Möhne Dam was repaired by 23 September 1943, in time to collect water needed for the following summer, when the British failed to follow up with additional raids to hamper reconstruction.

The 1955 docudrama The Dam Busters depicts the events of that time.

== Nature and environment ==
Lake Möhne is designated as a European bird sanctuary "Möhne Lake" in the EU's Natura 2000 system of protected areas. Lake Heve and the Heve arm in the south of Lake Möhne as well as the inlet of the Möhne into the lake are designated as the Hevearm and Hevesee nature reserve. The Heve forebay and adjacent areas have also been registered as an FFH site.

=== Importance for bird protection ===
Lake Möhne is an important resting place in North Rhine-Westphalia with four to six thousand waterfowl. The important resting birds are, with percentages for the years 2001 to 2006, the tufted duck with 31 percent, the mallard with 24 percent, the coot with 22 percent, the great crested grebe with 9 percent, the pochard with 5 percent and other species with 9 percent. An important reason for greater resting occurrences of diving ducks and coots is the presence of the migratory mussel in the lake. The zebra mussel forms mussel beds on the stony lake bottom with several thousand animals per square meter. At the inflows of the Möhne and the smaller streams into the lake there are occurrences of kingfisher, grey wagtail and dipper. However, their actual breeding sites are not directly at the lake, but at the tributaries. On the shore of the lake breed mallard, tufted duck, moorhen, coot, mute swan, greylag goose, Canada goose, Egyptian goose and great crested grebe. The great crested grebe has its largest breeding population in Westphalia here, with about fifty breeding pairs on the lake. The grey heron has a breeding colony on the Westenberg in Wamel with 15 to 30 occupied nests. The cormorant has so far made only unsuccessful breeding attempts, probably due to human disturbance. The red-necked grebe has also bred unsuccessfully at the lake several times since 2002. The little grebe, on the other hand, has had single successful broods in the past. A special feature was the year-round occurrence of the common eider, a sea duck, from September 2001 to December 2006. In July 2006, the first breeding record for North Rhine-Westphalia was found here: a female with three half-grown young. When the water level rose sharply in December 2006, the eiders could no longer reach the zebra mussel beds and left the lake. Other sea ducks also appear more frequently during the winter season.

=== Fish stock at Möhne Reservoir ===
Thirteen species of fish were found in the lake during sample fisheries conducted by the Ruhr Association. The largest stocks come from perch with 53 percent, ruffe with 20.3 percent and roach with 13.9 percent. In addition, whitefish, eel, pike, zander, brown trout, bream, carp, tench and chub are also found. Lake trout and eel occur only because of artificial stocking and do not reproduce naturally. The muskrat is also present.

== See also ==
- List of hydroelectric power station failures
