= The Great Escape (book) =

1950 book by Paul Brickhill

- First UK edition (publ. Faber); Cover art by Ley Kenyon
- Author: Paul Brickhill (1916–1991)
- Illustrator: Ley Kenyon
- Cover artist: Ley Kenyon
- Language: English
- Publisher: Norton (US), Faber (UK)
- Publication date: 1950 (US), 1951 (UK)

The Great Escape is a 1950 book by Australian writer Paul Brickhill (1916–1991), that provides an insider's account of the March 1944 mass escape from the Nazi German Luftwaffe (Air Force) prisoner of war (P.O.W.) camp Stalag Luft III for British and Commonwealth enemy airmen. The book was adapted in the 1963 film of the same name.

== Background ==
As a prisoner in the camp himself, Paul Brickhill participated in the escape plan but was barred from the actual escape attempt 'along with three or four others on grounds of suffering from claustrophobia'. The introduction to the book is written by George Harsh, an American P.O.W. at camp Stalag Luft III. Cover artist and illustrator Ley Kenyon had worked on a visual record of the tunnel while a prisoner there. This 1950 book along with other previously published material (for instance in his 1946 book Escape to Danger) was made into the 1963 film The Great Escape.

== Summary ==
View looking through fence to where one of the three routes Tunnel "Harry" exited just shy of the surrounding tree line.

The book covers the planning, execution and aftermath of what became known as The Great Escape. Other escape attempts (such as the Wooden Horse) are also mentioned as well as the post-war hunt for the Nazi German Gestapo agents who murdered fifty of the Allied airmen escapees on Hitler's direct order. The book was published in 1950. Brickhill, an Australian journalist before and after the war, had previously written four different accounts of the story, first as a BBC media talk / interview, then as newspaper and Reader's Digest magazine articles, and in the 1946 book Escape to Danger which he co-wrote with Conrad Norton. Within four years of the 1950 book, Brickhill had eliminated some of the less heroic aspects of the story, including the fact that a large proportion of the compound's imprisoned population had no interest in escaping.

Much of the book is focused on Royal Air Force Squadron Leader Roger Bushell, also known as the nicknamed "Big X", including his capture, early escape attempts, and planning of the escape. All the major participants and their exploits are described by Brickhill. Among these are Tim Walenn, the principal forger, who 'gave his factory the code name of "Dean and Dawson", after a well-known British travel agency'; Al Hake, the compass maker; Des Plunkett, the ingenious chief map tracer, who somehow made a mimeograph duplicating machine for reproducing maps; and Tommy Guest, who ran a team of tailors. American-born Major John ("Johnnie") Dodge (1894–1960), who had enlisted in the British Army in 1939 at the beginning of the European war (he was related by marriage to British prime minister Winston Churchill) and nicknamed "the Artful Dodger", was also one of the escapees. The German Luftwaffe officers and guards (called 'goons' by the prisoners) included teams of 'ferrets' who crawled about under the raised huts looking for signs of tunnels. They were carefully watched and surveilled by rotating teams of P.O.W. 'stooges', one of whom was future historian and author Paul Brickhill, 'boss of a gang of "stooges" guarding the forgers'.

In the end, seventy-six men escaped. Seventy-three were recaptured and fifty of those were shot by the Gestapo notorious secret police in violation of the ratified 1929 Geneva Convention on Prisoners of War, which specified that P.O.W.'s could not be killed for trying to escape. Four of the remaining twenty-three survivors later tunnelled again out of Sachsenhausen (a concentration camp to which they had been were transferred), but were recaptured and then chained to the floor of their cells. One of them, Major John ("Johnnie") Dodge, was released in order to try to secure a cease-fire or partial surrender by the Western Allies in April-May 1945; the offer was rejected. Only three escaped airmen prisoners eventually made it home safely.

The book is dedicated "to The Fifty".

In the aftermath, according to historian author Brickhill, five million Germans searched for the escaped Allied Powers airmen prisoners, many of them full-time for subsequent weeks. According to Brickhill's interviewer and biographer Stephen Dando-Collins, while this may have been claimed by the escapees, it is merely an exaggeration that added to the story's heroic narrative.

== The tunnels ==
Three tunnels were dug for the escape. They were nicknamed Tom, Dick, and Harry. The operation was so secretive that everyone was to refer to each tunnel by its name. Bushell took this so seriously that he threatened to court-martial anyone who even uttered the word "tunnel" aloud. Tom was dug in hut 123 and extended west into the forest; its length eventually reached 140 feet beyond the perimeter. The escapees were about to start digging vertically to the surface when it was found by the Germans and dynamited.

Dick was dug in the shower room of hut 122 and had the most secure, well-hidden trap door beneath the usually water-filled drain. It was to go in the same westward direction as Tom. The prisoners determined that the hut would not be a suspected tunnel site as it was further from the perimeter fence than the others. Dick was abandoned for escape purposes when the area where it would have surfaced was cleared for camp expansion. Dick was then used to store dirt, supplies, and as a workshop.

Harry, dug in hut 104, was the tunnel ultimately used for the escape. It was discovered as the escape was in progress with only seventy-six of the planned two hundred and twenty prisoners free. The Germans filled Harry with sewage and sand and sealed it off with concrete. After the escape, the prisoners started digging another tunnel called George, but this was abandoned when the camp was evacuated in 1945.

== After 'The Great Escape' ==
Sixty-eight years later, on 2 October 2012, Penguin Books released Human Game: The True Story of the 'Great Escape' Murders and the Hunt for the Gestapo Gunmen by author and journalist Simon Read. The book details the 50 murders that took place following the escape and the three-year manhunt by the British Royal Air Force to bring the killers to justice.

== In other media ==
A year after the publication of Brickhill's history book, on 27 January 1951, the National Broadcasting Company (NBC-TV) network televised a live drama, black-and-white adaptation of the World War II escape story as an episode of The Philco Television Playhouse, starring E.G. Marshall, Everett Sloane, Horace Braham, and Kurt Katch. The live, on-air broadcast was praised for engineering an ingenious set design, including creating the illusion of tunnels.

Twelve years later, in 1963, the Mirisch Company brothers worked with United Artists studios in Hollywood to adapt the 1950 book to produce the film The Great Escape starring Steve McQueen, James Garner, Richard Attenborough, Donald Pleasence, and James Coburn. The film was based on the real events, but depicts a heavily fictionalised version of the escape with numerous compromises made for its commercial appeal, such as including three Americans among the escapees. (In actuality, John "Johnnie" Dodge was the only one.) The characters are based on real men, though in some cases are composites of several men.
