= Mary Cleland =

Scottish novelist (1872–1937)

- Born: July 31, 1872
- Died: April 2, 1937; St Andrews
- Father: James Wells

Margaret "Margot" Barbour Wells (July 31, 1872 – April 2, 1937) was a Scottish novelist who used the pen name Mary Cleland. She was the author of urban realist novels set in Glasgow.

Mary Cleland was the daughter of the Rev. James Wells, D.D., minister of the Pollokshields West Free Church in Pollokshields, Glasgow.

Two of her novels cover the same period of time and share characters. In The Two Windows (1922), the waif Molly befriends Catherine, a middle class young woman. The Sure Traveller (1923) focuses on the ambitious and rebellious Catherine who wishes to attend Girton College, Cambridge against the wishes of her mother. Catherine laments "I know how it hurts to be baulked and thrust for life into a mould that isn't yours. A girl can't break away unless she has money of her own or training; and I have neither." Catherine fails to attend Cambridge but marries a childhood friend and they embrace rural Scottish life.

Mary Cleland died on 2 April 1937 in St Andrews.

== Bibliography ==
- The Silver Whistle. London: Heath Cranton, [1920]
- The Two Windows. London: Hodder & Stoughton, [1922]
- The Sure Traveller. London: Hodder & Stoughton, [1923]
- The Forsaken Way. London: Hodder & Stoughton, 1927.
