= Stephen Dando-Collins =

Australian historical author and novelist

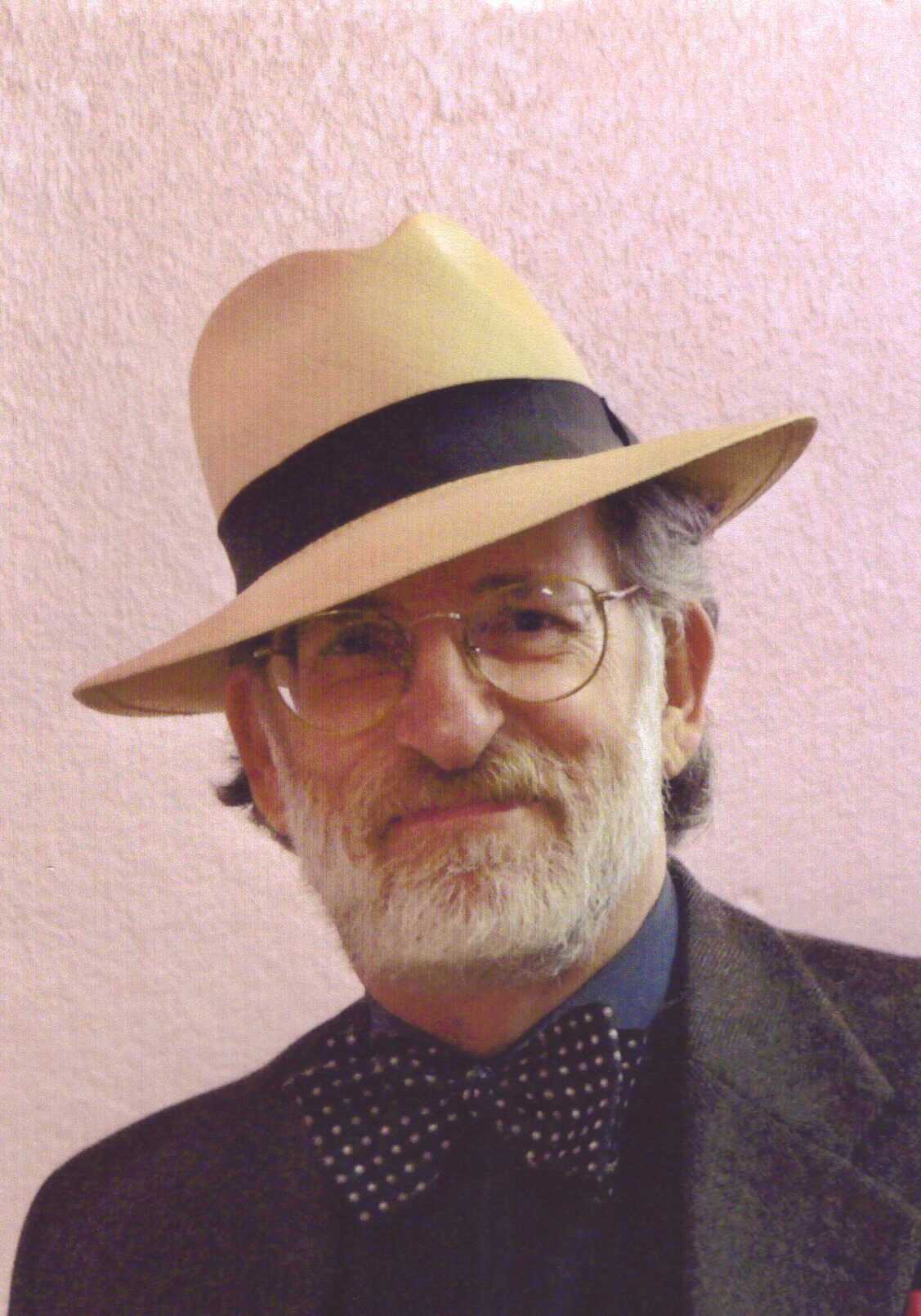
- Author Stephen Dando-Collins, 2010
- Born: 1 May 1950; Launceston, Tasmania, Australia
- Occupation: Writer
- Writing career
- Notable awards: 2009 Queensland Premier's Literary Award – Science Writers Award winner

Stephen Dando-Collins (born 1950) is an Australian historical author and novelist, with books on antiquity, American, Australian, British, and French history, and the two world wars.

== Career ==
After working in Australia and Britain as a graphic designer, copywriter, creative director, and senior advertising agency executive, he became an independent marketing consultant in Sydney. He ran the Australian operations of an American market research company before moving to Noosa Heads, and then to the Tamar Valley in Tasmania, where he writes full-time. He and his wife Louise, also an author, live in a former nunnery.

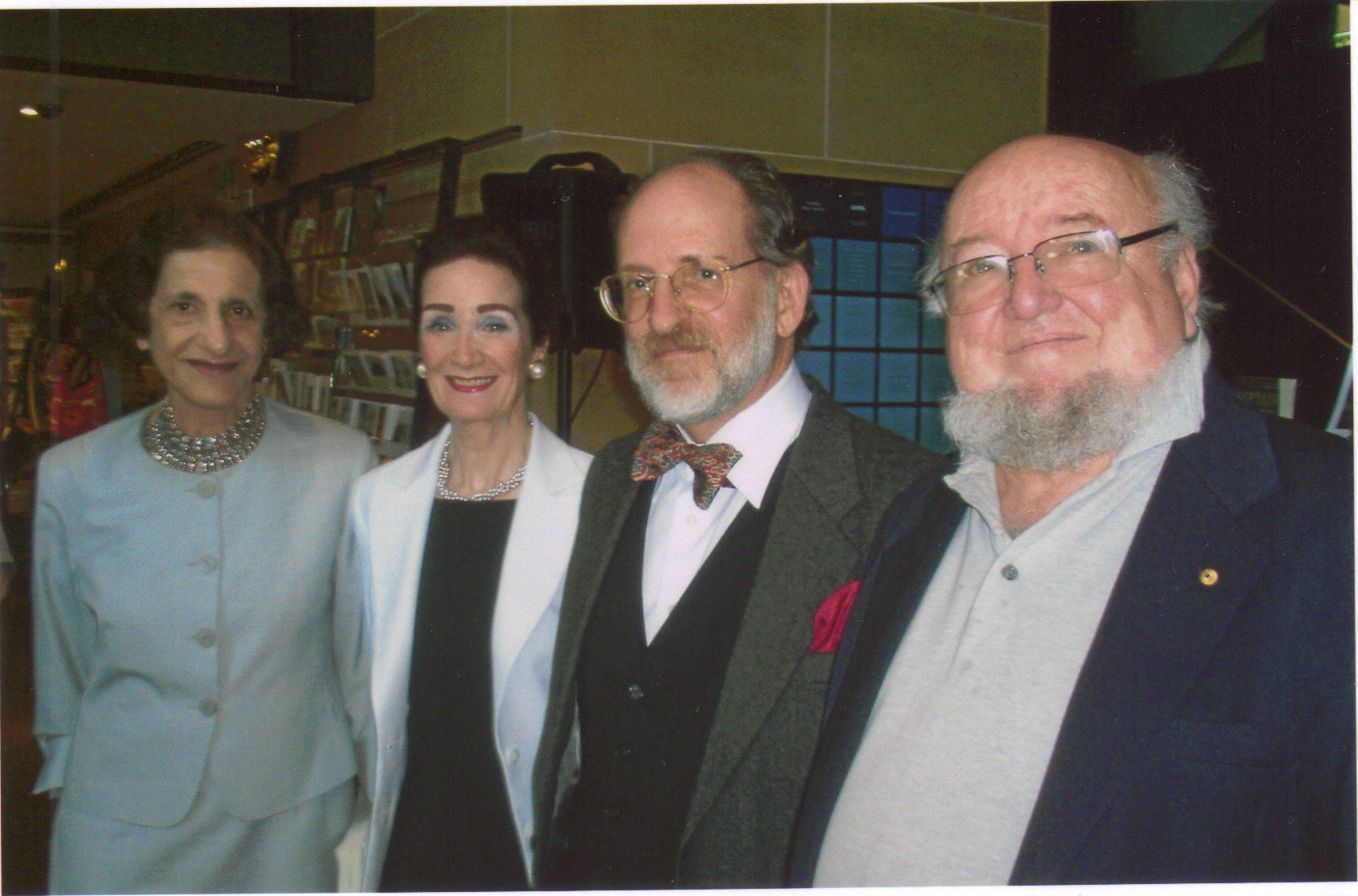
Dame Marie Bashir, then Governor of New South Wales, Louise Dando-Collins, Stephen Dando-Collins, and launcher Booker Prize-winning author Tom Keneally, at the Museum of Sydney launch of Stephen's Captain Bligh's Other Mutiny, 2007.

Dando-Collins and his wife founded the Festival of Golden Words in Tasmania's Tamar Valley, which has become the Tamar Valley Writers Festival.

Since his 2010 work Legions of Rome, (Quercus, London), Dando-Collins has focused on World War I and World War II history and the biographies of Australians who have made a mark on the world stage. He made a return to Roman history in 2019 with his biography of Caligula, third emperor of Rome, and to Persian history with his 2020 biography of Cyrus the Great, which won the Foreword INDIE silver award for biography the same year.

He also writes children's novels, the first of which, Chance in a Million, (Hodder Headline, Sydney, 1998), was filmed by PolyGram as Paws, starring Billy Connolly.

In 2012, he started the Caesar the War Dog series of children's novels, based on the true stories of modern-day military dogs serving in Afghanistan and elsewhere, with the fifth in the series published in 2016.

== Books ==
- Caesar's Legion: The Epic Saga of Julius Caesar's Elite Tenth Legion and the Armies of Rome (Wiley, New York, 13 February 2002)
- Nero's Killing Machine : The True Story of Rome's Remarkable 14th Legion (Wiley, Hoboken, 1 November 2004)
- Standing Bear Is a Person: The True Story of a Native American's Quest for Justice (Da Capo, Cambridge, Massachusetts, 3 November 2004)
- The Inquest (I-Books, New York, 22 February 2005)
- Cleopatra's Kidnappers : How Caesar's Sixth Legion Gave Egypt to Rome and Rome to Caesar (Wiley, Hoboken, 18 November 2005)
- Mark Antony's Heroes: How the Third Gallica Legion Saved an Apostle and Created an Emperor (Wiley, Hoboken, 24 November 2006)
- Blood of the Caesars: How the Murder of Germanicus Led to the Fall of Rome (Wiley, Hoboken, 22 February 2008)
- Captain Bligh's Other Mutiny: The True Story of the Military Coup That Turned Australia into a Two-Year Rebel Republic (Random House, Sydney, 1 October 2007).
- Tycoon's War: How Cornelius Vanderbilt Invaded a Country to Overthrow America's Most Famous Military Adventurer (Da Capo, Cambridge, Massachusetts, 5 August 2008).
- Pasteur's Gambit: Louis Pasteur, the Australasian Rabbit Plague & a Ten Million Dollar Prize (Random House, Sydney, 1 September 2008). Winner, 2009 Queensland Premier's Literary Award, Science category. Shortlisted, Victorian Premier's Literary Awards.
- The Ides: Caesar's Murder and the War for Rome, (Wiley, Hoboken, 5 February 2010).
- The Great Fire of Rome: The Fall of the Emperor Nero and His City. (Da Capo, Cambridge, Massachusetts, 23 September 2010).
- Legions of Rome: The Definitive History of Every Imperial Roman Legion. (Quercus, London, 9 December 2010).
- Crack Hardy: From Gallipoli to Flanders to the Somme, the True Story of Three Australian Brothers at War. (Random House, Sydney, 1 April 2011).
- Taking Hawaii: How Thirteen Honolulu Businessmen Overthrew the Queen of Hawaii in 1893, With a Bluff. (E-Reads, New York, 24 April 2012)
- Mistaken Identity:The Trials of Joe Windred. (Random House, Sydney, 1 December 2012).
- Caesar the War Dog, children's novel. (Random House, Sydney, 22 April 2013).
- Rise of an Empire: How One Man United Greece to Defeat Xerxes's Persians. (Wiley, Hoboken, 10 July 2013).
- Caesar the War Dog, Operation Blue Dragon. (Random House, Sydney, 1 August 2013).
- Sir Henry Parkes, the Australian Colossus. (Random House, Sydney, 1 February 2014).
- Tank Boys. (Random House, Sydney, 1 July 2014.)
- Caesar the War Dog, Operation Pink Elephant. (Random House, Sydney, 1 November 2014.)
- Operation Chowhound, the Most Risky, Most Glorious US Bomber Mission of World War 2. (Palgrave Macmillan, New York, 24 February 2015.)
- Caesar the War Dog, Operation Green Parrot. (Random House, Sydney, 14 April 2015.)
- Caesar the War Dog, Operation Black Shark. (Random House, Sydney, 17 March 2016 - US, May, 2016.)
- The Hero Maker: A Biography of Paul Brickhill. (Penguin Random House, Sydney, 29 August 2016.)
- The Big Break: The Greatest American WWII POW Escape Story Never Told. (St Martin's Press, New York, 13 February 2017.)
- Mr Showbiz: The Biography of Robert Stigwood. (Penguin Random House, Sydney, 2 October 2017.)
- Heroes of Hamel: The Australians and Americans Whose WWI Victory Changed Modern Warfare. (Penguin Random House, Sydney, 28 May 2018.)
- Caligula: The Mad Emperor of Rome. (Turner Publishing, Nashville, 30 July 2019.)
- Cyrus the Great: Conqueror, Liberator, Anointed One. (Turner Publishing, Nashville, 14 July 2020.)
- Constantine at the Bridge. (Turner, 2021).

The National Library of Australia holds some, but not all of these.

== Awards ==
- 2009 Queensland Premier's Literary Award – Science Writers Award winner, for Pasteur's Gambit: Louis Pasteur, the Australasian Rabbit Plague and a Ten Million Dollar Prize
- 2009 Victorian Premier's Literary Awards – Prize for Science Writing, shortlisted for Pasteur's Gambit: Louis Pasteur, the Australasian Rabbit Plague and a Ten Million Dollar Prize
