= Johnnie Dodge =

British Army officer (1894–1960)

John Bigelow Dodge
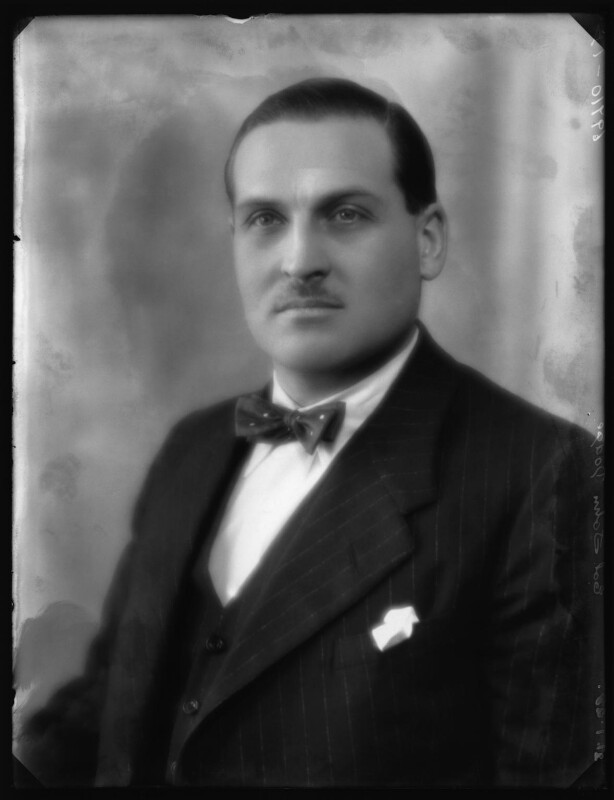
- Dodge in 1928
- Born: 15 May 1894; New York City, U.S.
- Died: 2 November 1960 (aged 66); London, England
- Relatives: John Bigelow; William E. Dodge; Winston Churchill
- Military career
- Allegiance: (United Kingdom) British Empire
- Branch: (United Kingdom) Royal Naval Volunteer Reserve; British Army
- Service years: 1914–1920, 1939–1946
- Rank: Major
- Nickname: The Artful Dodger
- Units: Royal Naval Division; Queen's Royal West Surrey Regiment; Middlesex Regiment; Royal Sussex Regiment
- Commands: 16th Battalion Royal Sussex Regiment
- Conflicts: First World War: Antwerp; Gallipoli; Western Front; Second World War: Battle of France
- Awards: Distinguished Service Order; Distinguished Service Cross; Military Cross

Major John Bigelow Dodge DSO DSC MC (15 May 1894 – 2 November 1960), also known as "the Artful Dodger", was an American-born British Army officer who fought in both world wars and became a notable prisoner of war during the Second World War, surviving the famous Great Escape in March 1944.

== Early life ==
Dodge's paternal great great grandfather was David Low Dodge, a pacifist and founder of the New York Peace Society. His great grandfather was William E. Dodge, co-founder of the well-known Phelps Dodge & Company. His grandfather was Brigadier-General Charles Cleveland Dodge, who fought in the American Civil War (1861-1865). His parents, Charles Stuart Dodge and Flora Bigelow (daughter of John Bigelow) divorced in 1902. Flora, who had custody of their two children, John and his sister Lucie, remarried to Lionel George William Guest, a cousin of British prime minister Winston Churchill, and moved to later live in Montreal, Quebec, in Canada. His education included the Fay School and St. Mark's School, in Southborough, Massachusetts, and then north to McGill University of Montreal, Quebec, in Canada.

== First World War ==
It was through Churchill, who then was First Lord of the Admiralty, that Dodge became commissioned into the Royal Naval Division, arriving in England in August 1914. He became a naturalised British citizen in 1915.

Dodge served in the 7th (Hood) Battalion of the Royal Naval Division first at Antwerp, then at Gallipoli. Together with Bernard Freyberg and two other officers, Dodge decided where Rupert Brooke was to be buried, and dug the grave on Skyros, immediately before the Gallipoli assault.

While serving as a lieutenant he was wounded at Gallipoli, and awarded the Distinguished Service Cross during this campaign. His award was published in the London Gazette on 8 November 1915.

He transferred to the British Army in April 1916 with the rank of captain, to the 10th Battalion Queen's Royal West Surrey Regiment (the recently raised 'Battersea Battalion), with whom he served on the Western Front, taking part in the Battle of Flers-Courcelette. He was promoted to major on 22 February 1918, was wounded on more than one occasion, and ended the war as an acting lieutenant-colonel commanding the 16th Battalion of the Royal Sussex Regiment fighting in France. He was further decorated with the Distinguished Service Order, this being gazetted on 3 June 1919.

He was demobilised on 18 December 1920, retaining the rank of major.

Dodge's American cousin, Braxton Bigelow, had also joined the British army to fight in the First World War. He was killed in Flanders in 1917.

== Interwar years ==
He made several expeditions through these years, including visits to China and Burma, however on a visit in 1921 to the Caucasus he was arrested by Cheka — the Soviet secret police as a suspected spy. After about two months of dreadful discomfort and narrowly avoiding execution, he was expelled from Russia with an order never to return there again. After this he changed his political view from socialist to conservative.

He served on London County Council as member for Mile End (East London) from 1925 to 1931. He failed in his bids to get into Parliament for the Mile End parliamentary constituency in the 1924 and 1929 general elections. As part of his campaign for the London County Council election in 1926, Dodge engaged in a boxing exhibition match against a local professional and sustained a black eye. He became a member of the London Stock Exchange and took up the directorship of a New York bank.

Johnnie married divorcee Minerva Sherman (née Arrington) (1902–1980) in New York about 1929. She was born in North Carolina; her great grandparents included Governor Tod Robinson Caldwell and General William Thomas Ward. They had two sons, David born 1930 and Lionel (known as Tony) in 1934, both born in England.

== Second World War ==
At the outbreak of the war, Dodge re-enlisted into the British Army, taking up the rank of major, serving with the Middlesex Regiment attached to the 51st (Highland) Infantry Division.

While awaiting action during the "Phony War" stage, Johnnie secured adoption as prospective Conservative parliamentary candidate for Gillingham for the next general election which was postponed by hostilities.

When the division surrendered at Saint-Valery-en-Caux in June 1940, Dodge attempted to evade capture, and swam out to sea in an attempt to board some ships he could see on the horizon. However, the ships moved off before he could reach them, so he returned to land, covering approximately seven miles before coming ashore. He was then captured by the Germans and became a Prisoner of War.

== Prisoner of War ==
Dodge, with many other POWs from the Allied defeat in France, was forced to march towards Germany. During the march his bare feet became badly cut, and eventually he was put on a barge with other Army prisoners for transport to Germany. While on the River Scheldt he jumped overboard, but was handed over to a Luftwaffe officer by a frightened Dutch civilian. As he had become a captive of the Luftwaffe, he, with all Air Force POWs, was sent to the Dulag Luft reception and transit camp at Oberursel.

=== Dulag Luft ===
At Dulag Luft, Dodge met the Senior British Officer, Wing Commander Harry Day who, with the agreement of the Camp Kommandant Major Rumpel, made Dodge part of the permanent British staff of the camp. Rumpel arranged for the records to show that he had been transferred to the Royal Air Force, and from then on, he remained with the RAF POWs.

Dodge made his second escape attempt alongside British officers Jimmy Buckley, Roger Bushell, and Wing Commander Harry Day, all of whom had been active participants in the tunnel's construction. In June 1941, 18 individuals from the permanent British staff, including Dodge, made their bid for freedom. None were successful, and all were recaptured within a week. Dodge was recaptured two days later walking along the autobahn a few miles south of Frankfurt. He was given a short period in solitary confinement before being transferred to Stalag Luft I at Barth, with the other recaptured escapees.

=== Stalag Luft I ===
Dodge became good friends with Harry Day who had taken over the role of Senior British Officer, and he helped Day with the running of the camp and plans of escape. He was transferred to Stalag Luft III at Sagan in April 1942.

=== Stalag Luft III (East Compound) ===
At Stalag Luft III, Dodge again acted as deputy to Day. In November 1942, he was transferred again, this time to Oflag XXI-B at Schubin in occupied Poland. En route to that camp, he escaped from the train, but was immediately seen, shot at and quickly recaptured.

=== Oflag XXI-B ===
Dodge did not take part in an escape attempt on 5 March 1943, involving 33 prisoners including Harry Day, and claims to the contrary in some accounts have been proven false. A later biography (2012) by Tim Carroll states that Dodge was not part of the group involved in the escape, and he did not claim to have been, in post-war debriefings. He was transferred back to Stalag Luft III in April 1943.

=== Stalag Luft III (North Compound) ===
Dodge became involved with the organisation of what became known as The Great Escape. Partly due to his large size, he did not help build the tunnels, but instead helped create diversions such as choir singing to help disguise the noise of the digging.

Dodge was given a place in tunnel "Harry" and escaped at approximately 0100 on 25 March 1944 as part of the famous The Great Escape. He travelled with Flight Lieutenant James Wernham RCAF towards Czechoslovakia. They were caught during the afternoon of the same day at the nearby Hirschberg main railway station. Taken to the Kriminalpolizei at Hirschberg they met other recaptured escapers, including Bertram "Jimmy" James.

Dodge was the first to be removed from Hirschberg, and was sent to Sachsenhausen concentration camp, where he was later joined by Jimmy James, Harry Day and Flight Lieutenant Sydney Dowse. James Wernham, together with 49 other recaptured escapers, were shot and murdered under Hitler's orders.

=== Sachsenhausen Concentration Camp ===
The "Great Escapers" were placed in Sonderlager A (Special Camp A) within the main camp. Here were housed a handful of other 'political' prisoners, including SOE agent Peter Churchill, two Russian generals, various other Russians, Poles, Italians and four British soldiers of Irish origin. Later they were joined by British Commando Jack Churchill. Dowse and James almost immediately began another tunnel, which was kept secret from all non-British personnel. This was completed and used on the night of 23 September 1944, when Dodge, James, Day, Dowse and Jack Churchill escaped. Dodge, who travelled alone, was on the run for over a month, and after receiving help from some French slave labourers, was arrested by a German farmer and returned to Sachsenhausen.

He, with the other four, who had also been recaptured, was placed in solitary confinement and chained to the floor in the death cells at the camp. Mainly through Harry Day's efforts all were spared execution.

=== Peace envoy ===
In February 1945, he was released from solitary and taken to Berlin, where he was asked by two senior German officials to act as a peace envoy to the British government with an offer of German surrender to the Western Allies of the British and Americans but not to the Russians. Dodge was asked to undertake this task because of his distant relationship to British prime minister Winston Churchill.

He returned to Britain, after traveling west to Dresden, where he survived the RAF air raid and fire bombing on 14 February, then south to Munich before crossing the border into neutral Switzerland. He arrived in Britain in May 1945 and met Churchill and the U.S. ambassador to Britain, John Gilbert Winant on 6 May 1945. He explained his adventures and the German peace proposal. History records the offer was not accepted.

== Later life ==
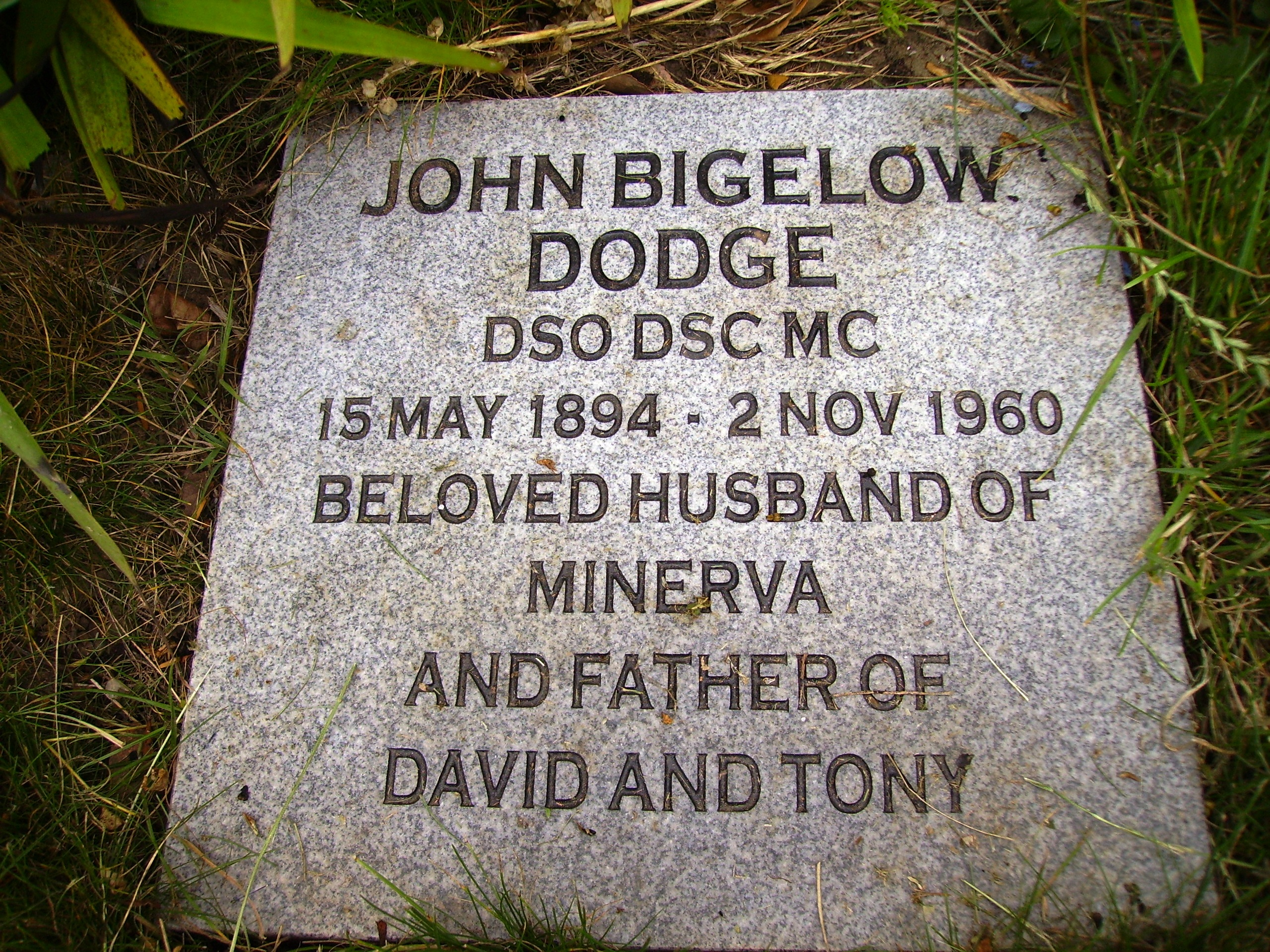
Memorial for John Bigelow Dodge, St Andrew's church, Ferring, West Sussex, Southern England

Dodge was awarded the Military Cross for his services as a POW, this being recorded in the London Gazette on 18 April 1946.

Post-war Dodge was a central figure leading the war crimes investigation to bring key Gestapo and other officials to justice who were responsible for carrying out the orders to murder 50 of the 76 escapees from Stalag Luft III.

He attempted to restart his political career, but with no success, when he stood at Gillingham at the 1945 General Election but lost narrowly to the winning Labour member, Joseph Binns.

He died, aged 66, of a heart attack when hailing a taxi near Hyde Park in London in November 1960. After cremation his ashes were buried at St Andrew's Church, Ferring, Sussex.

== Legacy ==
Dodge was portrayed by Christopher Reeve in the made-for-TV film The Great Escape II: The Untold Story (1988).
