= Oflag XXI-B =

World War II Nazi prisoner-of-war camp

- Szubin, German-occupied Poland
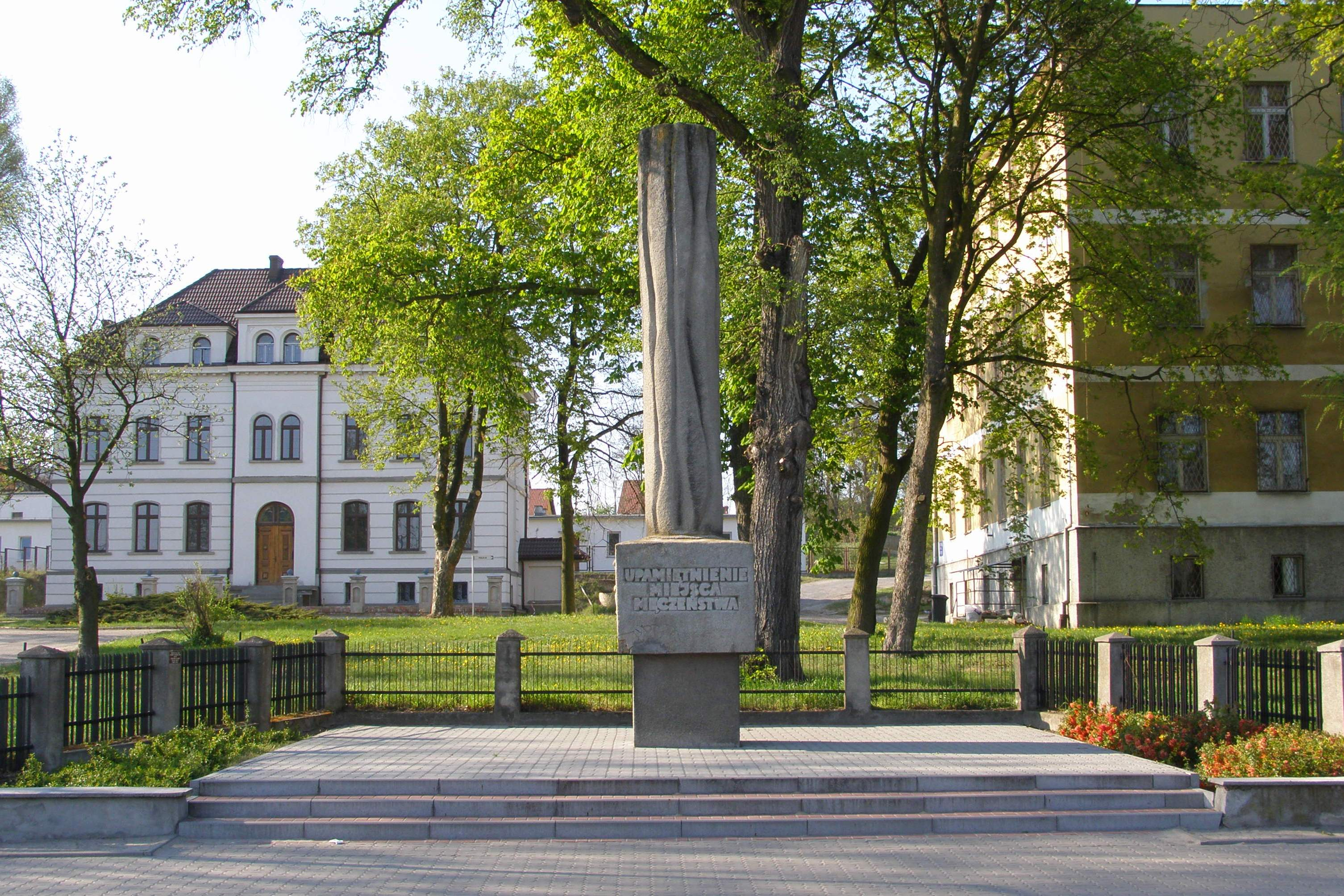
- Memorial to the prisoners and victims of the German POW camps in Szubin

Site information
- Type: Prisoner-of-war camp
- Controlled by: Nazi Germany

Location
- Szubin, Poland
- Coordinates: 53°1′N 17°45′E

Site history
- In use: 1940–1943

Garrison information
- Occupants: Polish, French, British, Canadian, Australian, New Zealand, American, and other Allied officers

Oflag XXI-B and Stalag XXI-B were World War II German prisoner-of-war camps for officers and enlisted men, located at Szubin a few miles southwest of Bydgoszcz, Poland, which at that time was occupied by Nazi Germany.

== Timeline ==
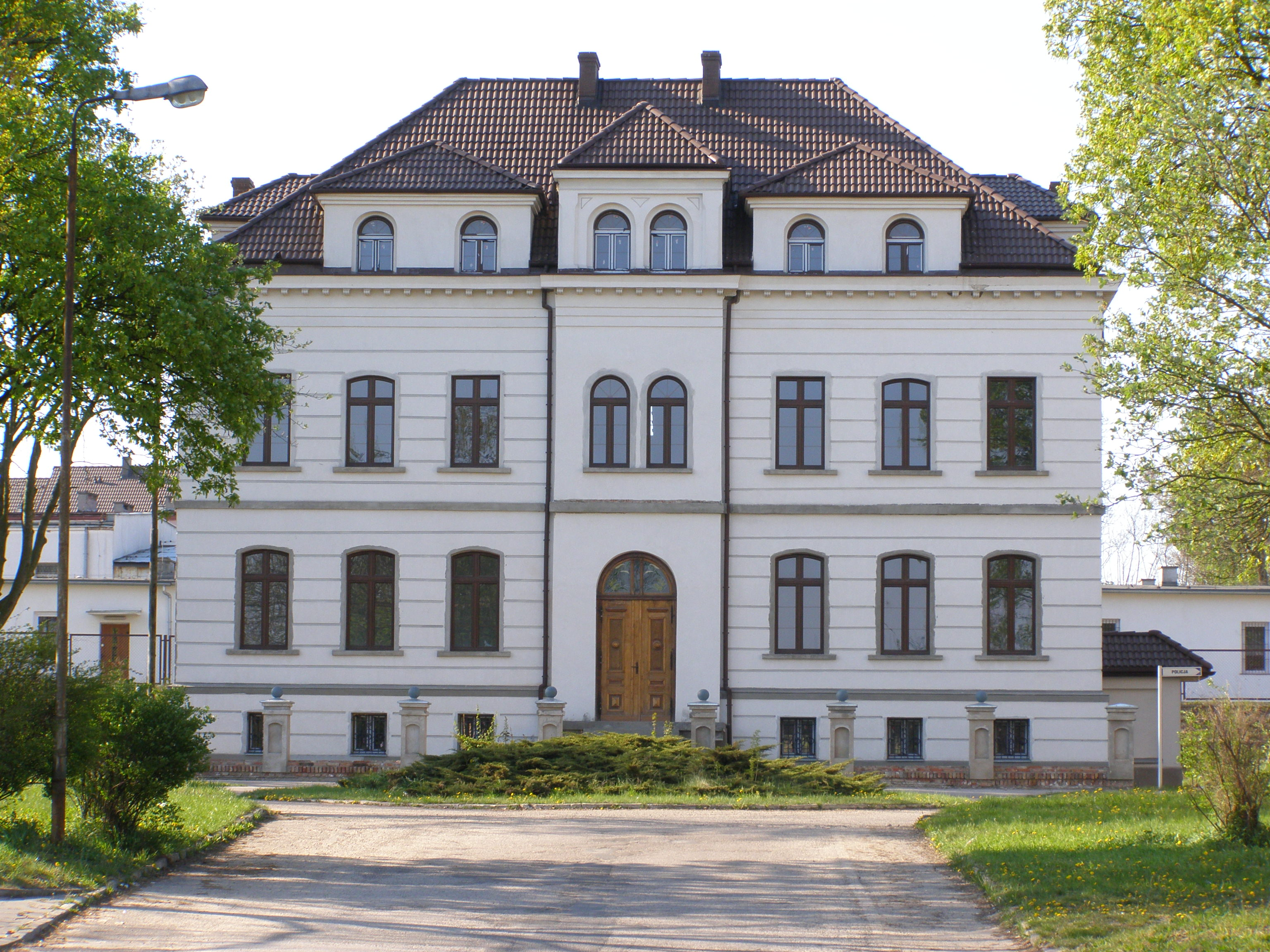
Former Polish boys' school, occupied by the Stalag XXI-B, Oflag XXI-B and Oflag 64 POW camps during the German occupation of Poland

- September 1939 – The Germans established a camp for arrested Polish civilians, mostly the intelligentsia, arrested as part of the Intelligenzaktion.
- October 1939 – First Polish soldiers captured during the German Invasion of Poland (1939) brought to Szubin, Kriegsgefangenenlager Schubin prisoner-of-war camp for Poles established. The camp was built around a Polish boys' school by adding barracks. Polish POWs were used for the expansion of the camp.
- December 1939 - The Germans formally established the Stalag XXI-B2 POW camp in Szubin, and the Stalag XXI-B1 POW camp in Antoniewo near Skoki, both for Polish POWs.
- March-May 1940 - Polish POWs were transferred to other camps, located in Germany.
- June 1940 - French officers were brought here from the Battle of France.
- August 1940 - Stalag XXI-B2 was renamed to Stalag XXI-B; Stalag XXI-B1 in Antoniewo was renamed to Stalag XXI-B/Z, and made a branch camp of the Stalag XXI-B in Szubin.
- September 1940 - Oflag XXI-B for Allied officers established. Its first prisoners were the French. Stalag XXI-B and Oflag XXI-B co-existed next to each other for three months.
- December 1940 – Stalag XXI-B was relocated to the nearby village of Tur. Polish officers, previously held together with enlisted men in other camps, were moved to Oflag XXI-B.
- 1941/1942 – All French officers had been transferred elsewhere prior to the arrival of British officer POWs.
- September 1942 – British and Commonwealth officers of the Royal Air Force and Fleet Air Arm were transferred from Oflag VI-B at Warburg following its temporary closure. These included airmen from Poland, Czechoslovakia and other occupied countries serving in the RAF, as well as airmen from the Allied Air Forces - RAAF, RNZAF, RCAF, SAAF, USAAF.
- October 1942 – More British RAF officers and NCOs arrive from Stalag Luft III to help relieve overcrowding there.
- November 1942 – A second batch of British RAF officers arrive from Stalag Luft III
- October to March 1943 - Newly captured British, American and Allied Air Force officers arrive in batches transferred from Dulag luft.
- March 1943 – A mass escape through a tunnel occurs - 35 men escape, albeit none are successful in reaching neutral territory.
- April 1943 – The camp is cleared of all POWs - all being sent to the enlarged Stalag Luft III.
- The camp was later re-opened and re-numbered Oflag 64 for American officers only.

British prisoners-of-war who died in the camp were later buried at a cemetery of the Commonwealth War Graves Commission in Poznań.

== Notable prisoners ==
- William Ash – American serving in RCAF, escapee and future author
- Anthony Barber – RAF pilot and future Chancellor of the Exchequer
- Per Bergsland – Norwegian pilot serving in RAF and Great Escape
- Josef Bryks – Czechoslovak RAFVR fighter pilot and serial escaper (1942 – March 1943).
- Jimmy Buckley RN – Fleet Air Arm Pilot and escapee
- Flight Lieutenant CC Cheshire – RAF Pilot and brother of Leonard Cheshire VC
- Aidan Crawley – RAF Officer and future author, journalist and MP
- Wing Commander Harry Day, Great Escape survivor, who was Senior British Officer November 1942 – March 1943
- Johnnie Dodge – British Army officer and Great Escape survivor
- Flight Lieutenant Bertram James – RAF Pilot and Great Escape survivor
- Robert Kee – RAF Pilot and future author and journalist
- Oliver Philpot – RAF Pilot and escapee
- Peter Stevens – RAF pilot of German-Jewish birth and serial escapee
- Jorgen Thalbitzer – Danish pilot serving in RAF
- Eric Williams – RAF Officer and escapee
- Albert W Harris - Private. The Buffs Royal East Kent Regiment.
- John Patrick Greenane - Private. Royal Engineers - Worked in Polish coal mines

== Sources ==
- Chew, JD. "Letters Home". Prisoner of War (1939–1945). Archived from the original on 2008-08-20.
- "Letters of Colin N. Dilly from Oflag XXI-B and Stalag Luft 3". BBC Online. Archived from the original on 2009-09-10.
- Gustavsson, Håkan (1 September 2008). "Squadron Leader George Dudley Craig OBE, RAF no. 90285". Biplane fighter aces. Håkan Gustavsson.

== See also ==
- List of German WWII POW camps
- Oflag
- Oflag 64
- Stalag Luft III
