= Peter Stevens (RAF officer) =

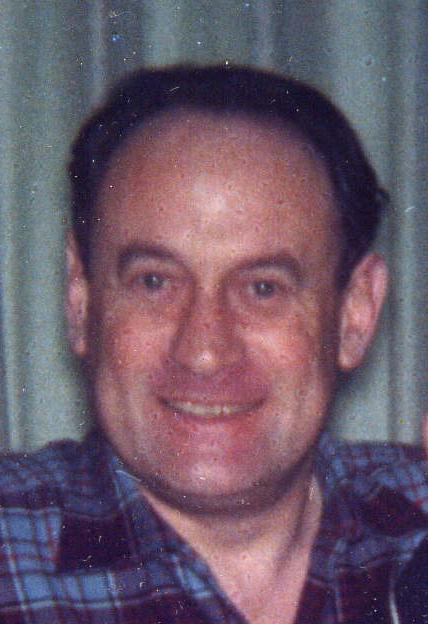
- Stevens in 1961
- Born: Georg Franz Hein; 15 February 1919; Hanover, Germany
- Died: 16 July 1979 (aged 60); Toronto, Ontario, Canada
- Military career
- Allegiance: United Kingdom; Canada
- Branch: Royal Air Force; Royal Canadian Air Force (Auxiliary)
- Service years: 1939–1952 (RAF); 1952–1958 (RCAF)
- Rank: Squadron Leader
- Service number: 88219
- Unit: No. 144 Squadron RAF
- Conflicts: World War II
- Awards: Military Cross
- Other work: MI6

Peter Stevens MC (born Georg Franz Hein; 15 February 1919 – 16 July 1979) was a German Jew who flew bombers in the British Royal Air Force in World War II. As an enemy alien living in London in the late 1930s, Hein assumed the identity of a dead schoolfriend in order to join the RAF at the outbreak of hostilities.

Shot down on a bombing raid, he was captured by the Germans and held a prisoner of war. Aware that if his true identity was discovered he would be regarded as a traitor he made repeated escape attempts, but was always recaptured. Liberated from the POW camp at the end of the war, he finally obtained British citizenship. In 1947, he transferred to MI6's East German section, retaining his RAF commission. After leaving MI6, he emigrated to Canada in 1952, embarking on a business career.

== Early life ==
Stevens was born Georg Franz Hein, on 15 February 1919 in Hanover, Germany, a member of a wealthy German-Jewish family. In 1934 his widowed mother sent him to school in England. He remained in England after finishing school, but ran up gambling debts and was jailed for fraud. He was released just days before Britain declared war on Germany, and should have reported to a police station for internment as an enemy alien. Instead he assumed the identity of a dead schoolfriend, Peter Stevens, and joined the RAF.

He trained as a bomber pilot for 18 months, all the while the subject of a manhunt by British police. Having reached the rank of leading aircraftman, he was commissioned as a pilot officer on probation in the Royal Air Force Volunteer Reserve on 2 November 1940.

== Active service ==
Joining RAF Bomber Command's 144 Squadron in April 1941, Stevens flew 22 combat operations in the Handley Page Hampden before his aircraft, Hampden AD936, was damaged over Berlin, and he was forced to crash-land, out of fuel, near Amsterdam on 8 September 1941. Taken as a prisoner of war, he spent three years and eight months as a prisoner of his own country (without protection from the Geneva Convention). Had the Nazis discovered his true identity, he would have been subject to immediate execution as a traitor. Although in captivity, he was promoted war substantive flying officer on 2 November 1941, and war substantive flight lieutenant a year later.

Stevens attempted escape nine times during his incarceration, twice spending several days at large. On one of those escapes, he and a Canadian pilot visited his mother's home to get civilian clothing, food and money, only to learn that she had committed suicide just before the outbreak of war. He was recaptured on both occasions and was sentenced to terms in the camp prison ("cooler") several times. His second escape attempt (from Oflag VI-B at Warburg) was characterized after the war as "The War's Coolest Escape Bid" in London's News Chronicle on 18 May 1946.

In this Warburg escape Stevens and Lance Pope were dressed as guards, guarding orderlies in a fake worker party. Pope and Stevens had been inserted into the escape plan to be the German guards by the escape committee because of the fact they spoke excellent German. Stevens and Pope's uniforms were made by fellow lags, Pete Tunstall and Dominic Bruce. Stevens and Pope carried dummy rifles and the documentation was forged by John Mansel. The escape was tried three times. The first two times the worker party escape was tried it was held back at the gates via faults in the documentation. In January 1942, the third time they attempted the bogus worker party, they forged the signature of the guard Feldwebel Braun. This opened the gate. However, this escape was immediately hindered by another guardsman who noticed that Feldwebel Braun could not have signed the papers as he was on compassionate leave. The guards then started firing, and the bogus workers party dispersed. Not one of the escape party was immediately caught and the German uniforms, the dummy rifles and the forged papers, which were in the possession of Stevens and Pope, were quickly stowed away in the hides at emergency speed. The German search party, though, did find a piece of green cloth, which was used to make the German uniform, on the grounds of the camp. Bruce and Tunstall were the two prisoners blamed for this by Major Rademacher.

Stevens was one of 35 men to escape from the latrine tunnel at Oflag XXI-B (Schubin, Poland) on 5–6 March 1943, along with Harry Day, William Ash, and Jimmy Buckley. Recaptured over 300 miles (480 km) from the camp after just 24 hours, he was handed over to the Gestapo, who were convinced he was a spy. After two days in their custody, the Luftwaffe succeeded in having Stevens released back into their hands, and he was returned to a POW camp.

As a native German, Stevens provided invaluable aid to many other escapees, including behind-the-scenes intelligence and scrounging work for the "Wooden Horse" escape and the "Great Escape", both at Stalag Luft 3. At Stalag Luft 3, Stevens was named the Head of Contacts (i.e. Scrounging) for the "X" escape organization in East Compound from April 1943 until that camp was evacuated westwards in January 1945. After liberation in 1945, Stevens was one of only 69 members of the RAF to be awarded Britain's Military Cross for his numerous escape activities. He is mentioned in at least twenty books about World War II escapes. His MC was announced in the London Gazette on 17 May 1946, along with those for several other RAF escapers, the citation read:

Flight Lieutenant Peter STEVENS (88219), Royal Air Force Volunteer Reserve, No. 144 Squadron. Flight Lieutenant Stevens was the captain of a Hampden aircraft detailed to bomb Berlin on 7th September 1941. After the mission had been completed the aircraft was hit by enemy antiaircraft fire and had to be crash-landed subsequently, on the outskirts of Amsterdam. Flight Lieutenant Stevens set fire to the aircraft, destroyed all documents and then, in company with the navigator, commenced to walk towards Amsterdam. They met a farmer who took them to his house and gave them food, at the same time promising to put them in touch with an organisation. Both walked across country for an hour, and then hid in a hut on a football field. They were later found by German Feldgendarmerie and taken to a Military prison, remaining there for two days. They were then sent to the Dulag Luft at Oberursel. Flight Lieutenant Stevens was moved to Lübeck on 20 September 1941. On 6 October 1941, he was entrained for Warburg, and during the journey he made his escape, accompanied by another officer, by crawling through a ventilator and dropping to the ground while the train was in motion. Shots were fired and the train was stopped but he and his companion managed to reach a wood where they hid until the departure of the train. Shortly afterwards they jumped on a goods train and reached Hannover on 8 October. Here Flight Lieutenant Stevens made contact with some pre-war acquaintances who provided him with food, money and civilian clothes. He, with his companion, then entrained for Frankfurt. Here they were challenged by Railway Police and arrested being subsequently sent to Oflag VI-B. at Warburg. On 1 December 1941, Flight Lieutenant Stevens made a further attempt to escape by disguising himself as a German Unter-Offizier. He led a party of 10 officers disguised as orderlies, and two officers disguised as guards with dummy rifles, and all marched through the gates of the camp. They had to return, however, as the sentry was not satisfied that the gate pass was correct. Flight Lieutenant Stevens marched his party back to the compound and the sentry was then quite unaware that the party was not genuine. A similar plan of escape was therefore adopted a week later, but on this occasion the sentry was immediately suspicious and demanded of the party their paybooks. The party then had to disperse hurriedly but two of its members were arrested. In September 1942, Flight Lieutenant Stevens was moved to Oflag XXI-B at Schubin. Here he made a fourth attempt to escape and managed to get away by means of a tunnel, carrying forged identity papers, wearing a civilian suit and carrying a converted great-coat. He took a train to Berlin, arriving there on the evening of 5 March 1943. He bought a railway ticket to Cologne and, when on the journey to that town, he was asked for his identity card by a Gestapo official. The latter discovered that it was forged, and Flight Lieutenant Stevens was then arrested and returned to the Oflag XXI-B, receiving as a punishment 14 days in the cells. Flight Lieutenant Stevens made a further attempt on 21 April 1943, but it was unsuccessful and he served a sentence of seven days in the cells. He was ultimately liberated by the Russian forces whilst at Stalag III-A on 21 April 1945.

== Post-war ==
Stevens remained in Germany as aide-de-camp to Air Vice Marshal Alexander Davidson and was promoted squadron leader. Davidson supported Stevens in his bid to officially obtain British nationality, and Stevens was naturalised as a British subject on 18 October 1946. He formally adopted the name Peter Stevens by deed poll on 20 March 1947, by which time he was living in East Sheen, London. He joined MI6 in 1947 and spent five years as an operative in Germany, spying against the Soviets at the height of the Cold War. He emigrated to Canada in 1952, resigning his RAF commission on 26 September 1952 and joining the Auxiliary section of the Royal Canadian Air Force. After a successful business career in Canada, Stevens died in Toronto on 16 July 1979.

Stevens' biography, Escape, Evasion and Revenge was named one of the "Top 10 Books About Revenge" in The Guardian newspaper on 14 April 2021.
