= Jimmy Buckley =

Fleet Air Arm officer

James Brian Buckley
- Born: c. 1905; United Kingdom
- Died: 21 March 1943 (age 38); Denmark
- Military career
- Allegiance: United Kingdom
- Branch: Royal Navy
- Service years: 1925–1943
- Rank: Lieutenant Commander
- Nickname: Jimmy
- Commands: No. 825 Squadron
- Conflicts: Second World War: Battle of France
- Awards: Distinguished Service Cross; Mentioned in Despatches

James Brian Buckley, DSC (c. 1905 – 21 March 1943) was a Royal Navy Fleet Air Arm pilot who became a notable prisoner of war during the Second World War. He died during an escape attempt on 21 March 1943.

== Fleet Air Arm ==
Buckley's naval career began in the mid-1920s. He was commissioned as a sub-lieutenant in the Royal Navy with seniority from 15 June 1926. He then spent much of his early career attached to the Royal Air Force (which then controlled the naval aviation requirements of the British Armed Forces), interspersed with periods of other naval duties. He continued to receive regular promotions within the Royal Navy during this period, to lieutenant on 1 December 1928, and lieutenant commander on 1 December 1936. Control of naval aviation returned to the Admiralty in 1939.

Buckley assumed command of No. 825 Squadron Fleet Air Arm in January 1940, which was equipped with Fairey Swordfish aircraft. With the squadron, Buckley operated from HMS Glorious and from RAF Hal Far on Malta. When the ship was recalled for operations in Norway, the squadron disembarked at Prestwick and then operated from Worthy Down, Detling and Thorney Island in operations against the advancing German forces in the Low Countries and France.

Buckley was shot down on a bombing raid during the defence of Calais on 29 May 1940 and was captured by the Germans on the same day. Command of the squadron was taken over by Lieutenant Commander Eugene Esmonde, who was later to be decorated with the Victoria Cross during an operation with the squadron.

Buckley was awarded the Distinguished Service Cross in July 1940 for "daring, endurance and resource in the conduct of hazardous and successful operations by the Fleet Air Arm working with the Coastal Command in France and over the Channel". His citation appearing in the London Gazette on 5 July 1940.

== Dulag Luft Oberursel ==
Buckley, as an aircrew prisoner, was taken to Dulag Luft transit camp, where he became a member of the permanent British staff at the camp. He arrived at the camp with Squadron Leader Roger Bushell, who had also been shot down near Calais on 23 May 1940. Bushell also became a member of the permanent staff.

The senior British officer (SBO) of the camp was Wing Commander Harry Day. Day appointed Buckley as his adjutant and in October 1940 appointed him as head of the escape committee.

Buckley, with numerous others, participated in the building of three tunnels, of which one was completed and used for an escape in June 1941. Buckley, Day and 16 others escaped, but were all recaptured within a few days. Buckley was caught heading towards the Baltic on a train near Hann Minden. All the recaptured escapers, including Buckley, Bushell and Day, following a brief period in solitary confinement, were transferred to Stalag Luft I at Barth.

== Stalag Luft I, Barth ==
At Stalag Luft I, Day again assumed the role of senior British officer, and again appointed Buckley as head of the escape committee.

Buckley took charge of all escaping operations, and was instrumental in a number of escape attempts, including numerous tunnel projects, although he only made one unsuccessful attempt to escape himself.

The compound at Barth was becoming overcrowded and, due to the number of escape attempts being made, the German authorities, under directions from Reichsmarschall Hermann Göring, decided to transfer all air force prisoners to a newly built camp at Sagan.

== Stalag Luft III, Sagan ==
Buckley, with all other POWs from Barth, was transferred to Stalag Luft III in April 1942. The escape organisation remained unchanged with Buckley at its head. To improve security and provide anonymity from the Germans, Buckley became known as 'Big X' – a term later made famous by its use by Roger Bushell and the character based on him, played by Richard Attenborough in the film, The Great Escape.

Buckley again helped organise numerous escape attempts, including a daring daylight attempt, when two officers cut through the wire under the noses of the sentries. Buckley had organised elaborate diversions, allowing the escapees to cut through to freedom. Both men were recaptured within a few days.

By October 1942, the compound at Stalag Luft III was becoming overcrowded, and the Germans transferred a number of officers to Oflag XXI-B at Schubin in northern Poland. Buckley was among the men transferred there. Day went too. Buckley handed over command of the escape organisation at Sagan to Roger Bushell.

== Oflag XXI-B Schubin ==
The camp at Schubin was administered by the German Army (the Wehrmacht), and had recently held French POWs. It was dirty and conditions were poor. However, under Day's leadership, morale was high. Escape attempts almost immediately got under way, once again under Buckley's command.

Following a disagreement between the camp commandant and Day (the senior British officer) over camp conditions, Day instigated several tunnel schemes by which a mass escape attempt could be made, with the sole objective of having the commandant removed by the German authorities for failing to prevent a mass break out.

Several tunnels were started, the first being finished in March 1943. Buckley, as head of the escape organisation, was given a place in the tunnel.

The escape took place on the night of 5 March 1943. Buckley, with 34 others (including Day, future MP and journalist Aidan Crawley, journalist/author Robert Kee, German-Jewish RAF pilot Peter Stevens and future Chancellor of the Exchequer Anthony Barber) crawled through the 150 ft tunnel, which started from the camp Abort (toilet block). All were recaptured within a few days, except for Buckley and his travelling companion, a young Danish officer Jorgen Thalbitzer (who was using the name Flying Officer Thompson to hide his real identity from the Germans).

Buckley and Thalbitzer are known to have travelled to Copenhagen before attempting a crossing by canoe to neutral Sweden. They never arrived, and their fate is not completely understood. Thalbitzer's body was washed ashore some time later. However, Buckley's body was never found.

Buckley's date of death is recorded as 21 March 1943. He was 38 years old when he died, and is commemorated on the Lee-on-the-Solent Memorial (Bay 4 Panel 24). He was posthumously Mentioned in Despatches for his services as a POW. This award was recorded in the London Gazette dated 4 June 1946.

== Sources ==
- Wings Day by Sidney Smith
- The Great Escape by Paul Brickhill
- Moonless Night by Bertram James
- Under the Wire by William Ash
- WO 208/3296 – Official Camp History – Oflag XXI-B Schubin (Oflag 64) – from the Catalogue of The National Archives
- WO 208/3269 – Official Camp History – Dulag Luft (Oberusel): RAF personnel – from the Catalogue of The National Archives
