= All Saints' Church, Lund, East Riding of Yorkshire =

Church in Lund, East Riding of Yorkshire, England

Coordinates: 53°55′13″N 0°31′27″W

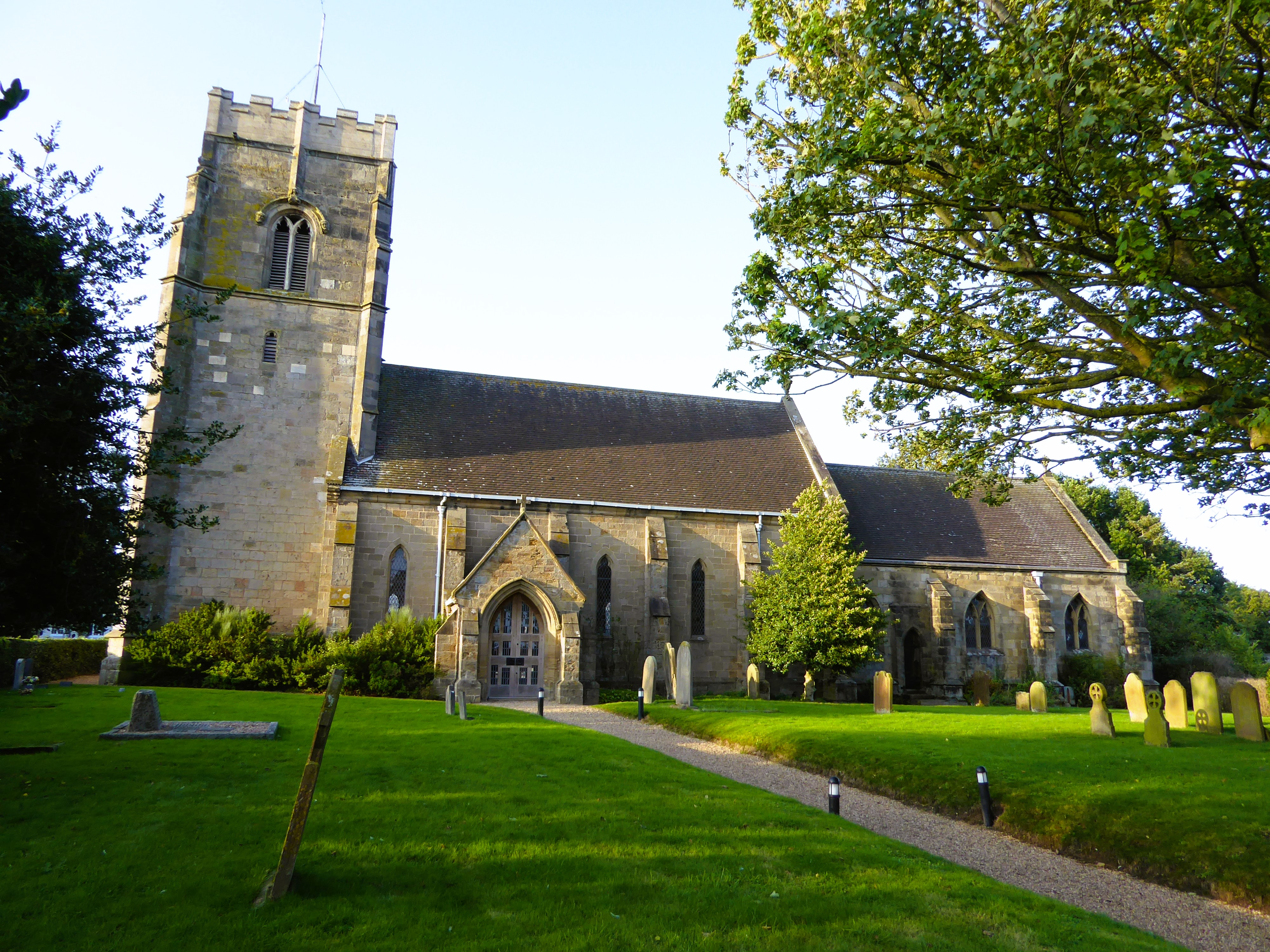
The church, in 2023

All Saints' Church is the parish church of Lund, East Riding of Yorkshire, a village in England.

The oldest part of the building are the pillars of the north arcade, probably dating from the early 13th century. The tower was constructed around 1400. The chancel was rebuilt between 1845 and 1846 by Robert Dennis Chantrell, followed in 1853 by the nave, rebuilt to a design by Cuthbert Brodrick. The church was grade II* listed in 1968.

View from the nave into the chancel

The church is built of stone with a tile roof, and consists of a nave, a north aisle, a south porch, a chancel with a north vestry, and a west tower. The tower has two stages, a moulded plinth, diagonal buttresses, a three-light pointed west window with a hood mould and a statue above, a small trefoil-headed window, two-light pointed bell openings with hood moulds, and an embattled parapet. Inside, there is a 12th-century tub font, a 15th-century tomb recess, mediaeval effigies of two women, and part of an alabaster chest tomb.

== See also ==
- Grade II* listed buildings in the East Riding of Yorkshire
- Listed buildings in Lund, East Riding of Yorkshire
