= John Fancy =

- Born: 9 March 1913; Lund, East Riding of Yorkshire
- Died: 16 September 2008 (aged 95); Slapton, Devon
- Military career
- Allegiance: United Kingdom
- Branch: Royal Air Force
- Service years: 1935–1945
- Rank: Warrant Officer
- Nickname: The Mole
- Awards: Mentioned in dispatches
- Other work: Inspiration for the book and film The Great Escape; Tunnelling to Freedom (Panther, 1957, ASIN B0007JJ9IS); Flights of Fancy (Navigator, 1986, ISBN 0-902830-65-1) market gardener

John Fancy (9 March 1913 – 16 September 2008) was a British former airman whose tunnelling escapes from various German prisoner of war camps during World War II earned him the nickname The Mole, and inspired the book and film The Great Escape.

Fancy was born in 1913 in the vicarage at Lund near Driffield in Yorkshire. He was educated at Hymers College and looked set to follow his father into a career in estate management but joined the RAF in 1935 instead. Although slightly colour blind he was passed fit for aircrew as an air observer and achieved the rank of Warrant Officer. His service record included delivering Blenheim bombers to Finland and operations over the North Sea including a raid on Stavanger. His squadron was then moved to operations over Northern Europe in support of the British Expeditionary Force rearguard actions which culminated in Operation Dynamo.

He was first captured on 14 May 1940, when the Blenheim in which he was serving as air observer/navigator was shot down by German anti-aircraft fire while returning from a raid on Sedan, France. He was taken to Stalag Luft I (the Germans maintained separate POW camps for aircrew), as prisoner 89 he was one of the first allied airmen to be captured.

In all Fancy escaped from custody some sixteen times, and constructed eight separate tunnels from various camps, using a German-issued steel table knife as his principal tool. The knife became his prized possession after the war. As an escapee he had many adventures, including being captured by an extermination squad and being subjected to three mock executions.

Though he was Britain's most prolific tunnel-digger and once got as far as a boat off the Baltic coast, he was recaptured every time and was finally repatriated in April 1945 when his camp was liberated by the advancing Allied forces. He later observed: "After four years, 10 months and four days I landed back in England after taking off on what should have been a four-hour flight." He was mentioned in dispatches for his conduct.

After the war Fancy established a market garden near Driffield and ran three greengrocery shops in Scarborough. Following the death of his wife in 1983 he retired to Slapton, Devon to be near his daughter.

Fancy published two books about his experiences in the war: Tunnelling to Freedom (Panther, 1957, ASIN B0007JJ9IS) and Flights of Fancy (Navigator, 1986, ISBN 0-902830-65-1).

== See also ==
- Stalag Luft I
- Stalag Luft III
- The Great Escape (book)
- The Great Escape (film)
