= Lund, East Riding of Yorkshire =

Village and civil parish in the East Riding of Yorkshire, England

Coordinates: 53°55′11″N 0°31′26″W

Lund
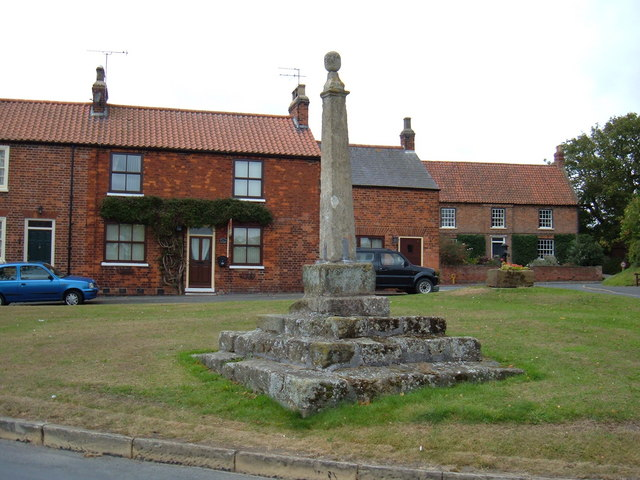
- Village centre, Lund

- Location within the East Riding of Yorkshire
- Population: 308 (2011 census)
- OS grid reference: SE970480
  - London: 165 mi (266 km) S
- Civil parish: Lund
- Unitary authority: East Riding of Yorkshire
- Ceremonial county: East Riding of Yorkshire
- Region: Yorkshire and the Humber
- Country: England
- Sovereign state: United Kingdom
- Post town: DRIFFIELD
- Postcode district: YO25
- Dialling code: 01377
- Police: Humberside
- Fire: Humberside
- Ambulance: Yorkshire
- UK Parliament: Beverley and Holderness

Lund is a village and civil parish in the East Riding of Yorkshire, England. It is situated approximately 6 miles (10 km) north-west of Beverley and 7 miles (11 km) south-west of Driffield.

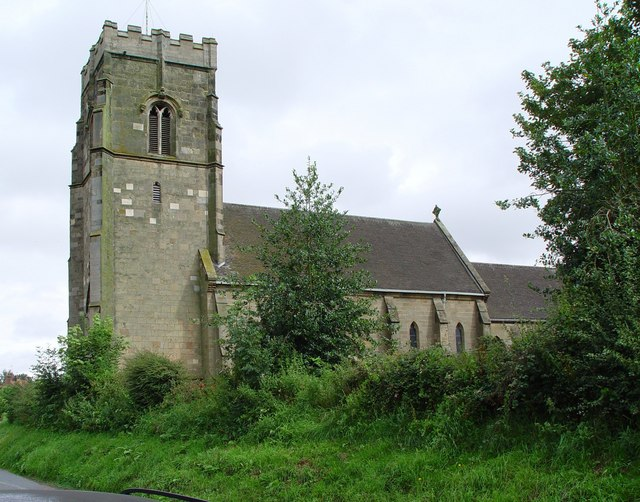
All Saints Church

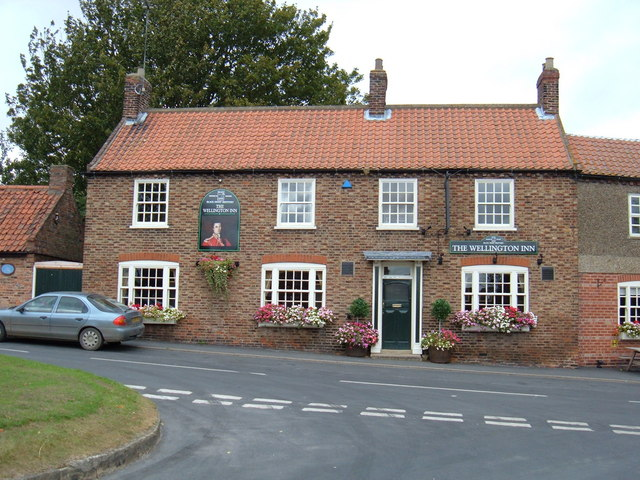
The Wellington Inn

According to the 2011 UK census, Lund parish had a population of 308, an increase on the 2001 UK census figure of 289.

The name Lund derives from the Old Norse lundr meaning 'grove'.

The Anglican All Saints' Church, Lund is a Grade II* listed building.

In 1823 Lund was in the Wapentake of Harthill. In the market place the remains of a market cross was used as a focus to sell goods every Thursday in Lent. The parishioners had erected a public school for an unlimited number of children. Population at the time was 357. Occupations included fifteen farmers, one of whom was in occupation of the seat of a local notable family. There were three shoemakers, three shopkeepers, two tailors, a parish clerk and a parish constable, a schoolmaster, a workhouse governess, a blacksmith, a bricklayer, a saddler, a butcher, and the landlords of The Plough, and The Lord Wellington public house. Three carriers operated between the village and Beverley and Market Weighton twice weekly.

John Fancy, the Second World War airman and escapee from German captivity was born in the village.

== In fiction ==
Location sequences for the village and church of "Hinton St. John" in the Robert Donat film Lease of Life (1954) were filmed in Lund, and nearby Beverley.

== See also ==
- Listed buildings in Lund, East Riding of Yorkshire
