= Bertram James =

British diplomat (1915–2008)

Bertram Arthur James
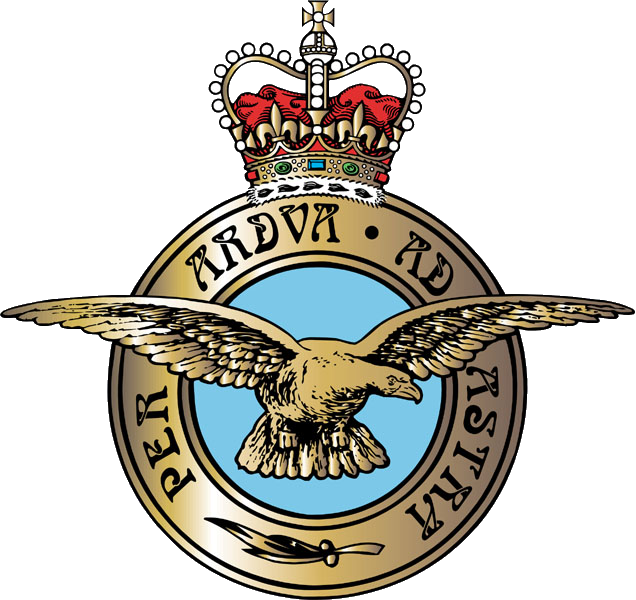
- Born: Bertram Arthur James; 17 April 1915; India
- Died: 18 January 2008 (aged 92); Shrewsbury
- Military career
- Allegiance: United Kingdom
- Branch: Royal Air Force
- Service years: 1939–1958
- Rank: Squadron leader
- Nickname: "Jimmy"
- Unit: No. 9 Squadron RAF
- Conflicts: Second World War: European theatre; Channel front (POW); Cold War
- Awards: Military Cross
- Known for: One of the "Great Escapers"
- Relatives: Prof. Philip Seaforth James (first cousin)

Bertram Arthur "Jimmy" James, MC (17 April 1915 – 18 January 2008) was a British survivor of The Great Escape. He was an officer of the Royal Air Force, ultimately reaching (some years after the Great Escape) the rank of Squadron Leader.

== Early life ==
James was born in India, the son of a tea-planter, Herbert Mark James and his wife Elizabeth Isabella Loosemore. James was educated at The King's School, Canterbury. Returning to London following his mother's death, James and his father started a tea importing business that suffered from the 1930s economic downturn and ultimately failed. Soon after, his father died of pneumonia which left Jimmy alone. Recalling that he had relatives in the United States, he worked his passage on a coal ship across the Atlantic, often acting as pilot due to the drunken nature of the crew. Upon arrival, he soon realised that his relatives were also suffering due to the Great Depression that was sweeping across the US. He thus decided to head north. With little more than the clothes he wore, Jimmy rode the cattle cars across the plains of middle America. This journey left a deep and enduring impact upon the young Jimmy and, after hooking up with a small band of hobos, he learnt to live as an itinerant. Eventually, Jimmy arrived in Canada, again to meet up with cousins. Work was scarce, but he managed to find a job acting as a security guard in a local bank. "They gave me a gun and told me to watch the door. If anyone came through it, I was to shoot them", Jimmy recalled to his great friend, Howard Tuck. He worked in British Columbia from 1934 until volunteering for pilot training with the RAF in 1939 after seeing a recruiting poster in Vancouver. Taking another ship back to the UK, Jimmy soon found himself at the Air Force selection board in London before heading off for IOT (initial officer training).

== Military career ==
James was initially commissioned as an acting pilot officer, and was promoted to pilot officer (on probation) on 9 December 1939. That rank was confirmed on 28 February 1941 (back-dated to 1 May 1940) when he was also promoted to war substantive flying officer with effect from 9 December 1940.

James was posted to No. 9 Squadron RAF at RAF Honington in April 1940 after completing his flying training. He was a second pilot of a Wellington bomber when he was shot down over the Netherlands on 5 June 1940 and he was then taken prisoner.

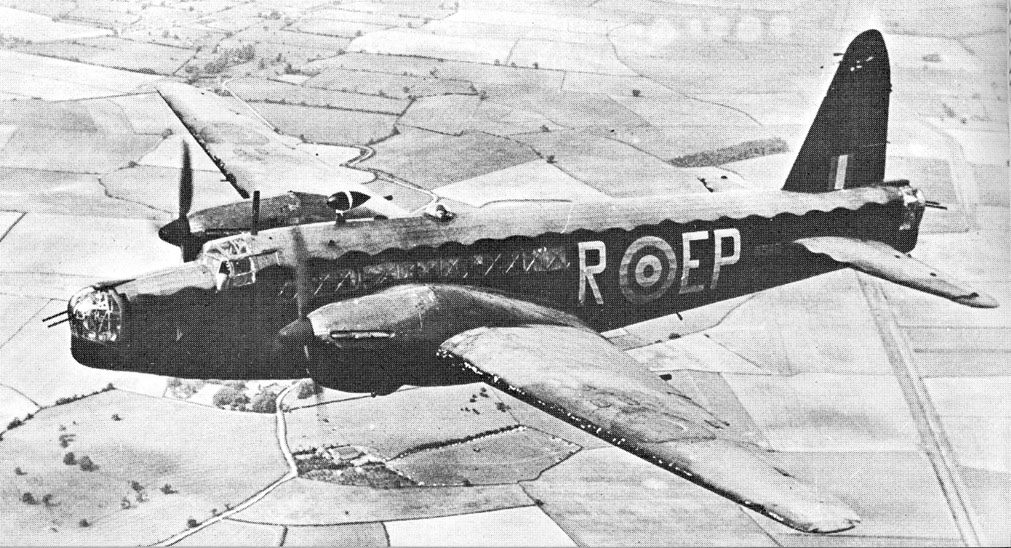
The Merlin-engined Wellington Mark II. This aircraft actually belongs to No. 104 Sqn. Notice the criss-cross geodesic construction through the perspex fuselage panels.

== Prisoner of war ==
Following initial interrogation, James and a small band of others were taken to Berlin and paraded through the capital. "It was a rather ghastly affair really. They weren't hostile, as the bombing hadn't really started, but we were rather curious to them, I suppose". From Berlin, James was moved to the notoriously bleak Stalag Luft I at Barth on the northern coast of Germany. The camp was still under construction at this stage of the war and the reality was that the Germans were only slowly coming to terms with POWs. Within a matter of days, Jimmy and W/Cdr John 'Death' Shore were planning an escape– the route was to be via the camp incinerator. Digging a high Criminal Police (Kripo) and taken to the Gestapo HQ in the town. Following a transfer to the local prison, Skantzikas was taken out to be shot, whilst James remained in his cell totally unaware of why he was saved from execution.

In Berlin, SS-Gruppenführer Arthur Nebe was ordered by Heinrich Müller, Chief of the Gestapo, to select and kill fifty of the seventy-three recaptured prisoners in what became known as the "Stalag Luft III murders". Fifty were then executed, James being one of a handful sent instead to the Sachsenhausen concentration camp. On 23 September 1944, James escaped from Sachsenhausen, accompanied by Jack Churchill, Harry Day, Johnnie Dodge and Sydney Dowse using small cutlery knives to dig an escape tunnel over 110 metres long. On the run for several weeks, he was finally arrested in Pomerania before being transferred back to solitary confinement in Sachsenhausen. James's cell was tiny, just enough to stand up and stretch. For over four months Jimmy James suffered daily harassment from the guards, mock executions and, of course, virtually no food. As the Red Army was approaching, the SS decided to move the Prominenten prisoners further south, possibly to act as a bargaining chip with the Allies – though this has never been confirmed. Following a torturous journey via Dachau and Flossenbürg concentration camps, James and other Prominenten were moved to the South Tyrol where they were eventually liberated by partisans and US Army troops in May 1945.

== Awards ==
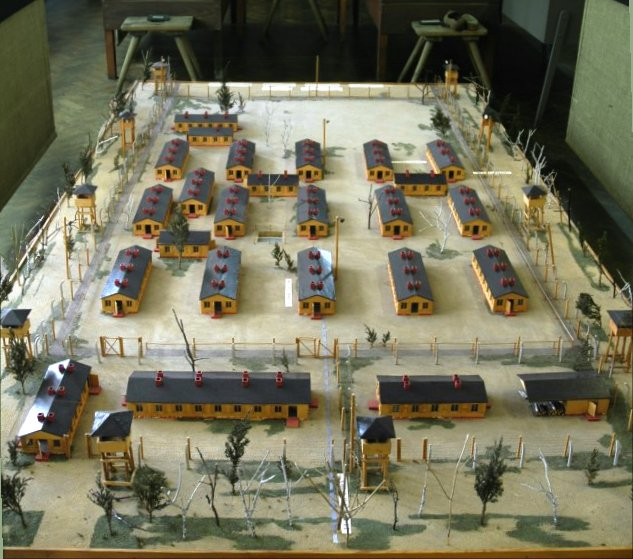
Model of Stalag Luft III prison camp.

At the end of the war he was awarded the Military Cross (MC) and Mentioned in Despatches for his repeated escape attempts. The citation for his MC was published in a supplement to the London Gazette of 14 May 1946 (dated 17 May 1946) and read:

Air Ministry, 17th May, 1946.

The KING has been graciously pleased to approve the following awards: —

Military Cross.

Flight Lieutenant Bertram Arthur JAMES (42232), Royal Air Force, No. 9 Squadron.

On the night of 5 June 1940, Flight Lieutenant James was the second pilot of a Wellington aircraft which was hit by enemy anti-aircraft fire and had to be abandoned whilst over the Netherlands. He made a successful parachute descent some 25 miles south of Rotterdam, disposed of his equipment, and evaded some people who were approaching, but subsequently was captured by the Germans. He was held at Oberursel for four days for interrogation. Later he was sent to Stalag Luft I at Barth from which camp he made an attempt to escape during an air raid on 21st October, 1941. His attempt, which was made after a tunnel had been constructed, was unsuccessful and as a punishment he received 14 days' solitary confinement. In November, 1941, he was discovered whilst engaged in the construction of a second tunnel, and was sentenced to another 14 days' solitary confinement. While at Stalag Luft I, he worked on the construction of at least five other tunnels, all without success. His next attempt was made whilst at Stalag Luft III (Sagan) in July 1942, when he, with another prisoner, managed to slip away from a sick parade and hide in a cow shed. Here they began to construct another tunnel, but were discovered when it was 21 feet long. For this, Flight Lieutenant James served a sentence of 14 days in the cells. In April 1943, he, with others, commenced the construction of a tunnel which resulted in the escape of 76 officers, but unfortunately 50 R.A.F. officers were shot by the Germans whilst endeavouring to get away. Flight Lieutenant James, however, managed to leave with civilian clothes and forged documents and, together with eleven others, entrained for Boberohrsdorf, arriving there the next morning. Here the party decided to split up into pairs. Flight Lieutenant James and his companion walked across country towards Hirschberg, but were apprehended by German Police. Flight Lieutenant James was eventually sent to Sachsenhausen Concentration Camp where, with others, in May, 1944, he commenced the construction of a tunnel some hundred feet in length, and 10 feet below the surface. On 23 September 1944, he and four others escaped through this tunnel. Flight Lieutenant James and a companion made their way towards Rostock, but were arrested by members of the German Home Guard who returned them to the Concentration Camp where they were put in cells. Flight Lieutenant James remained in the cells from 6 October 1944, until 15 February 1945. He was ultimately liberated by the Allied forces on 6 May 1945.

== Post-war RAF career ==
After the war, James was initially transferred to the reserve, but retained on active service, but was later granted a regular commission in the RAF (though in a non-flying role). On 9 December 1952, he transferred to the RAF Regiment, and retired as a squadron leader on 11 June 1958.

== Later life ==
James married shortly after the war to a nurse, Madge, he met in an Officers Club at Vlotho in Germany. Their honeymoon was in itself a remarkable journey as they drove to the far tip of Norway in a former German Army Volkswagen Beetle. Their marriage lasted for 61 years until his death.

After a period working for the Intelligence Services in Berlin, Jimmy returned to the UK and was subsequently made General Secretary of the Great Britain-USSR Association, sponsored by the Foreign and Commonwealth Office, until joining the Diplomatic Service in 1964. He subsequently held posts in Africa, Western and Eastern Europe and London. After retiring in 1975, he visited Sachsenhausen with Jack Churchill and other survivors of the camp. In 2008, James and historian Howard Tuck pioneered a project to build a replica barrack at the former site of Stalag Luft 3 in Poland (formerly part of Germany). James was also a well known public speaker, touring the country and overseas to recount his wartime experiences. As a stalwart of the RAF Ex-Prisoners of War Association, James was a regular visitor to RAF Stations where he would host presentations and talk to all ranks about the lessons of captivity. He served as the British representative on the International Sachsenhausen Committee until shortly before his death at the age of 92 at the Royal Shrewsbury Hospital on 18 January 2008.

His funeral was held at St Peter's Catholic Church, Ludlow on 31 January 2008. A party of RAF Regiment gunners from RAF Honington served as pallbearers. Other personnel from the Defence College of Aeronautical Engineering at Cosford were also present, as was Air Commodore Bob McAlpine, a former CO of No. 9 Squadron. Hundreds of local people from Ludlow lined the procession route to pay their respects to the great war hero as four Tornado GR4s of 9 Squadron (Jimmy's former squadron) performed a flypast in the missing man formation. Jimmy James wrote an excellent account of his time as a prisoner of war in his book, Moonless Night.

== Bibliography ==
- Ted Barris (2014). The Great Escape. Dundurn Publishing. ISBN 978-1459728448.
- Tim Carroll (2005). The Great Escape from Stalag Luft III. Pocket Publishing. ISBN 1416505318.
- Simon Read (2012). Human Game. Constable. ISBN 978-1-4721-1262-0.
- Sean Feast (2015). The Last of the 39-ers. Grub Street. ISBN 978-1909166158.
- Jonathan F Vance (2000). A Gallant Company. Pacifica Military. ISBN 978-0-935-55347-5.
- William Ash; Brendan Foley (2005). Under the Wire: The Wartime Memoir of a Spitfire Pilot, Legendary Escape Artist and 'cooler King'. Bantam. ISBN 978-0-593-05408-6.
- Paul Brickhill (2004). The Great Escape. W.W. Norton & Company. ISBN 978-0-393-32579-9.
- Alan Burgess (1990). The Longest Tunnel: The True Story of World War II's Great Escape. Naval Institute Press. ISBN 978-1-59114-097-9.
- Albert P. Clark (2005). 33 Months as a POW in Stalag Luft III: A World War II Airman Tells His Story. Fulcrum Pub. ISBN 978-1-55591-536-0.
- Arthur A. Durand (1 January 1989). Stalag Luft III: The Secret Story. Patrick Stephens Limited. ISBN 978-1-85260-248-2.
- William R Chorley (1992). RAF Bomber Command Losses, Volume 2. Midland Counties. ISBN 0-904597-87-3.
- Allen Andrews (1976). Exemplary Justice. Harrap. ISBN 0-245-52775-3.
- Vance, Jonathan F (2000). A Gallant Company: The Men of the Great Escape. Pacifica Military History; (Mar 2001). p. 41. ISBN 978-0-935-55347-5.
