= Ranjana Ash =

Indian-born writer and literary critic (1924–2015)

- Born: Ranjana Sidhanta; 6 December 1924; Birbhum, West Bengal, India
- Died: 10 August 2015 (aged 90); London, England
- Other name: Ranjana Sidhanta Ash
- Education: Lucknow University; Iowa University
- Occupations: Writer, literary critic, academic and activist
- Spouse: Bill Ash (m. 1955)

Ranjana Ash (née Sidhanta; 6 December 1924 – 10 August 2015) was an Indian-born writer, literary critic, academic and activist, who was a leading advocate of south Asian and African writing. She moved in the 1950s to England, where she married American-born writer and broadcaster Bill Ash.

== Biography ==
Born Ranjana Sidhanta in Birbhum, West Bengal, she spent her early years in Lucknow, attending the local women's college. Graduating from Lucknow University, where she studied political science, she won an Indian government scholarship in 1947 to Iowa University. On completing her doctorate she returned in 1949 to India, and became a lecturer at Aligarh University, before moving back to Lucknow, teaching at the university there between 1951 and 1954.

She had also begun broadcasting to schools, and meeting a BBC correspondent to India would change her life, as described by Alastair Niven in The Guardian: "In 1952, while on a riding holiday in Kashmir, she met William Ash, a left-wing American broadcaster who had been a pilot and war hero, and was one of the originals for Steve McQueen's character in the 1963 film The Great Escape. He had settled in the UK and she followed him on a scholarship in May 1954, studying for an MA in sociology at the Institute of Education. In 1955 they married."

Living in London, England, she wrote for the pacifist magazine Peace News, was active in the Movement for Colonial Freedom, joined, with her husband, the Communist Party of Britain Marxist-Leninist, and joined with such activists as Marion Glean, David Pitt and C. L. R. James in the 1960s Campaign Against Racial Discrimination (CARD). She taught part-time in schools, and took an MA in African studies at the School of Oriental and African Studies, London University, becoming an authority particularly on the writing of Chinua Achebe. Her writings appeared in such publications as the journal of postcolonial writing Kunapipi, Wasafiri and PN Review, and she was a contributor to Susheila Nasta's Motherlands: Black Women's Writing from Africa, the Caribbean, and South Asia (The Women's Press, 1991). Ash was particularly concerned with translation from South Asian languages, publishing Short Stories from India, Pakistan, and Bangladesh in 1980. In 1982 she founded the South Asian Literary Society, continuing to promote authors from the Indian sub-continent.

Ash died in 2015 in London, aged 90.

== Selected bibliography ==
- (With Joan Goody, Leslie Stratta, Hugh Knight, Jean Mills, Rob Jeffcote) "English in a Multicultural Society", English in Education, Vol. 11, No. 1, Spring 1977.
- Short Stories from India, Pakistan and Bangladesh, Harrap, 1980, ISBN 978-0245535710.
- "Growing up with Tagore: Finding the Personal and Political in Rabindranath's Works", Performing Arts and South Asian Literature, Volume 5, Number 2.
- "Introducing Tagore in Multicultural Education in Britain". In: Lago, M., and R. Warwick (eds), Rabindranath Tagore. Palgrave Macmillan, London, 1989. https://doi.org/10.1007/978-1-349-09133-1_10.
- Writers from India, Book Trust, 1990, ISBN 978-0853534372.
- "Indian Women's Writing in English", Kunapipi, Vol. 16, issue 1, 1994.
- "Two Early-Twentieth-Century Women Writers". In Arvind Krishna Mehrotra (ed.), A History of Indian Literature in English, New York: Columbia University Press, 2003, pp. 126–34.
- "Introducing South Asian Literature into the English Curriculum", English in Education 11(1), June 2008, pp. 25–30. https://doi.org/10.1111/j.1754-8845.1977.tb00236.x
