= The Great Escape II: The Untold Story =

1988 television film directed by Paul Wendkos

- Promotional release poster
- Written by: Walter Halsey Davis
- Directed by: Paul Wendkos (Episode 1); Jud Taylor (Episode 2)
- Starring: Christopher Reeve; Judd Hirsch; Anthony Denison; Michael Nader; Ian McShane; Charles Haid; Donald Pleasence
- Music by: Johnny Mandel
- Country of origin: United States
- Original language: English

Production
- Executive producer: Michael Jaffe
- Producer: Jud Taylor
- Production location: Yugoslavia
- Cinematography: Dietrich Lohmann
- Editors: Christopher Cooke; Paul LaMastra
- Running time: 178 minutes
- Production company: Michael Jaffe Films

Original release
- Network: NBC
- Release: November 6 – November 7, 1988

The Great Escape II: The Untold Story is a 1988 American made-for-television action-adventure drama film and a sequel to The Great Escape (1963). It stars Christopher Reeve, Judd Hirsch, Anthony Denison, Ian McShane, Charles Haid and Donald Pleasence in a supporting role (in the 1963 original Pleasence had played Flight-Lieutenant Colin Blythe, "The Forger"). The second episode was directed by Jud Taylor (in the 1963 original Taylor had played 2nd Lt. Goff). The Great Escape II premiered as a two-part miniseries on NBC on November 6 and 7, 1988, with each episode running two hours, including commercials.

The Great Escape II is not a true sequel, as it dramatizes the escape itself, like the original film, but mostly by using the real names of the individuals involved; the original film fictionalized them and used composite characters. The murder of the prisoners is more accurate than in the 1963 original, with the POWs being shot individually or in pairs, but other portions of the film are fictional. It depicts the search for those responsible for the murder of the Allied officers and the subsequent trials. The film features the exploits of Major Johnnie Dodge (played by Christopher Reeve), an American-born British Army officer and cousin of Winston Churchill, and largely follows his journey to freedom after the escape. The second half of the film is based on the postwar investigation into the murders of fifty of the escapees by the Gestapo, conducted by Dodge and two fictional Americans (whereas in fact it was conducted by the Royal Air Force Special Investigation Branch).

== Plot ==
Episode 1: The prisoners at Stalag Luft III plot their escape from the camp. After their escape, 50 of the 76 escapees are caught and murdered by the Gestapo. Major John Dodge is released to Switzerland.

Episode 2: After the war, Dodge leads a special task force to hunt down the culprits responsible for the murders.

== Cast ==
- Christopher Reeve as Major John Dodge
- Judd Hirsch as Captain David Matthews
- Anthony Denison as Lieutenant Mike Corey
- Ian McShane as Squadron Leader Roger Bushell
- Charles Haid as Sergeant MacKenzie
- Donald Pleasence as Dr. Absalon
- Michael Nader as Burchardt
- Mijou Kovacs as Marie-Chantal Dubers
- Derek de Lint as Dr. Thost
- Andrew Bicknell as Wings Day
- Karlheinz Lemken as Herr Schmidt
- Ron Donachie as Al Hake
- Peter Dennis as Group Captain Herbert Massey
- Geoffrey Beevers as Jim Kitteridge
- Christopher Neame as Kiowski
- Dominic Gould as Jules
- Brian Pettifer as Thomas Kirby-Green
- Ian Redford as Willie
- Bill Wallis as Schatz
- Ludwig Haas as Adolf Hitler
- Ronald Lacey as Winston Churchill
- Klaus Grünberg as Erich Zacharias
- Vladan Živković as Pankrac Prison Warden (uncredited)

== Release ==
=== Home media ===
When released on VHS, nearly an hour and a half was cut out from the full miniseries.

In September 2024, Film Chest released The Great Escape II: The Untold Story for the first time on Blu-ray with the complete two-episode, 178-minute cut. In December 2024, Arrow Video released the full two-episode, 178-minute cut on a 4K UHD Blu-ray exclusively as a bonus feature on the limited edition 4K UHD Blu-ray set of the original film.

== Reception ==
=== Critical response ===
The film was nominated for the Outstanding Sound Mixing for a Miniseries or a Special award at the Primetime Emmy Awards.
