= Pow Wow (newspaper) =

German underground newspaper

Pow Wow (stylised in all caps) was a German underground newspaper, run by prisoners of war in the Stalag Luft I camp in Nazi Germany. Its name stood for Prisoners Of War - Waiting On Winning and its motto was "The only truthful newspaper in Germany - to be read silently, quickly, and in groups of three".

It gave prisoners information on what was happening outside of the camp, and how close the war may be to being over. At the height of its circulation, it had over 9,000 readers and was translated into French and Russian as well as English.

They received their information from new prisoners and smuggled in German newspapers and, most crucially, a secret radio. On some occasions, they were able to receive information faster than German media. When Pow Wow received the news of the Normandy landings, they had to delay publication, because the prisoners' excitement would arouse suspicion.

Pow Wow was started by Lowell Bennett, an American war correspondent, but he was discovered, and in April 1944 control of the paper was given to Ray Parker, an American pilot who had been shot down in April 1944. He became editor of Pow Wow within weeks of arriving at Stalag Luft I, after being shot down and captured, when his senior officer in the camp, J. R. Byerly heard he had been a reporter for the Los Angeles Examiner.

Although the Germans knew about Pow Wow and tried to destroy it, from March 1944 to May 1945 they failed to stop a single issue. Parker was discovered three months before the end of the war and forced to cease publishing, but survived the war and moved back to the United States.
