= Jorgen Thalbitzer =

- Jørgen Thalbitzer on the wing of Spitfire Vb BL855 (AZ-U Niels Ebbesen) of 234 Squadron on 10 April 1942 at RAF Coltishall
- Born: 22 May 1920
- Died: 29 March 1943 (aged 22)
- Military career
- Allegiance: Denmark
- Branch: Royal Air Force
- Service years: 1941–1943
- Rank: Flying Officer
- Conflicts: World War II

Flying Officer Jorgen Billy Thalbitzer (22 May 1920 – 29 March 1943) was a Danish pilot who joined the British Royal Air Force during the Second World War, became a prisoner of war (POW) and died following escape from prison.

== Royal Air Force Service ==
Thalbitzer learnt to fly and qualified for a private pilots licence at the age of eighteen.

Following the German invasion of Denmark in April 1940, Thalbitzer escaped to England; he left Denmark on 26 December 1940 and travelled via Istanbul, Cyprus, Suez and Cape Town. He was accompanied by Sigfred Johannes Christophersen, who was later to become a British agent in Denmark before being killed in 1943.

He was commissioned into the Royal Air Force on 28 October 1941 as a Pilot Officer and trained to fly Hurricanes. He first served with 32 Squadron, before being re-trained to fly Spitfires and joining 234 Squadron at Tangmere.

During 1941 and 1942 a group of Danish businessmen living in England collected £38,000 among themselves. This sum was used to purchase three Spitfires. The money was given to Winston Churchill by a group of Danish pilots, including Thalbitzer, on 9 April 1942. One of the aircraft bought with the money, serial BL855 (named Niels Ebbesen), was later flown by Thalbitzer.

== Prisoner of War and Escape ==
On 23 July 1942, while flying Spitfire AB864, Thalbitzer was shot down during a 'Rhubarb' mission to Lannion and crashed into high tension wires near Plouescat. He evaded capture for around 14 days, before being caught and becoming a prisoner of war (POW). He used the assumed name of 'John Thompson' to hide his real identity from the Germans, to help protect his family who were still living in occupied Denmark.

He was initially sent to Stalag Luft III where he became involved with the escape organisation headed by Lieutenant Commander Jimmy Buckley. In November 1942 he was sent with Buckley, to Oflag XXI-B in Poland.

An escape tunnel had been constructed at Oflag XXI-B, aided by Thalbitzer; it was used for a mass escape on 5 March 1943. Thalbitzer escaped with Buckley, together they first travelled to Stettin hoping to find a Danish or Swedish ship which might be able to take them to neutral Sweden. However they were unable to locate any suitable ships, and after narrowly avoiding recapture, they 'jumped' onto a train bound for Rostock. Here they also found no suitable ships. From Rostock they decided to head for Copenhagen and reached the city after passing through numerous identity checks using forged papers created in the POW camp. In Copenhagen, Thalbitzer contacted his father, Billy, and through the Danish underground forces, it was arranged for Thalbitzer and Buckley to make the crossing to Sweden using a canoe.

They departed the Danish coast at 10pm on 28 March 1943, but were never seen alive again. Thalbitzer's body was later recovered, but Buckley's was never found.

Thalbitzer was initially buried on 7 July 1943 at Tibirke churchyard, however after his body was identified, by means of his ring with the family coat-of-arms, his urn was interred on 31 July 1943 at Vestre Cemetery.

He is also commemorated on the Maidenhead Register, a memorial for non-Commonwealth nationals killed on British military service during the Second World War.
