= Roger Bushell =

South African British air force officer and POW escape leader (1910-1944)

Squadron Leader Roger Bushell
- Bushell in his Royal Air Force uniform shortly before his capture
- Born: 30 August 1910; Springs, Transvaal, South Africa
- Died: 29 March 1944 (aged 33); Ramstein, Germany
- Military career
- Allegiance: United Kingdom
- Branch: Royal Air Force
- Service years: 1932–1944
- Rank: Squadron Leader
- Commands: No. 92 Squadron RAF (1939–40)
- Conflicts: Second World War
- Awards: Mentioned in Dispatches

Squadron Leader Roger Joyce Bushell (30 August 1910 – 29 March 1944) was a South African aviator in the British Royal Air Force. He masterminded the famous "Great Escape" from Stalag Luft III in March 1944, but was one of the 50 escapees to be recaptured and subsequently shot and murdered by the Nazi German Gestapo secret police.

== Birth and early life ==
Bushell was born in Springs, Transvaal, South Africa, on 30 August 1910 to English parents, Benjamin Daniel and Dorothy Wingate Bushell (née White). His father, a mining engineer, had immigrated to the country from Britain and he used his wealth to ensure that Roger received a first-class education. He was first schooled in Johannesburg, then aged 14 went to Wellington College in Berkshire, England. In 1929, Bushell then went to Pembroke College, Cambridge to study law.

Keen on pursuing non-academic interests from an early age, Bushell excelled in rugby and cricket and skied for Cambridge in races between 1930 and 1932, captaining the team in 1931.

=== Skiing ===
One of Bushell's passions and talents was skiing: in the early 1930s, he was declared the fastest Briton in the male downhill category. After the war, a black run was named after him in St. Moritz, Switzerland, in memory of his efforts to organize Anglo-Swiss ski meetings. He additionally won the slalom event of the annual Oxford-Cambridge ski race in 1931.

At an event in Canada, Bushell had an accident in which one of his skis narrowly missed his left eye, leaving him with a gash in the corner of it. Although he recovered from this accident, he developed a dark droop in his left eye as a result of scarring from his stitches.

Bushell became fluent in French and German, with a good accent, which became extremely useful during his time as a prisoner of war.

== Career ==
Squadron Leader Roger Bushell (right) with Wing Commander Robert Stanford Tuck.

=== Auxiliary Air Force and legal career ===
Despite his sporting prospects, one of Bushell's primary wishes was to fly. In 1932 he joined No. 601 Squadron Auxiliary Air Force (AAF), which was often referred to as "The Millionaires' Mob" because of the number of wealthy young men who paid their way solely to learn how to fly during training days (often on weekends). He was commissioned on 10 August 1932 and promoted to flying officer on 10 February 1934, and flight lieutenant on 20 July 1936.

Although Bushell was pursuing a career with the RAF, he was not hampered in his attempts to become a barrister-at-law of Lincoln's Inn, London. From the outset of his legal career, many commented on his ability as a lawyer, particularly in criminal defence. After a period, Bushell was appointed to military cases in prosecuting RAF personnel charged with various offenses. These often involved pilots charged with dangerous flying. In October 1939, acting as assistant to Sir Patrick Hastings, he successfully defended two RAF pilots, John Freeborn and Paddy Byrne, court-martialled after the friendly fire incident known as the Battle of Barking Creek. Byrne would later be incarcerated with Bushell at Stalag Luft III.

From left: Squadron Leader Roger Bushell, Leutnant Eberhardt (German security) and Paddy Byrne (fellow POW)

=== Regular military career ===
Bushell was given command of No. 92 Squadron in October 1939. His promotion to squadron leader was confirmed on 1 January 1940. During the squadron's first engagement with enemy aircraft on 23 May 1940, while on a patrol near Calais, to assist with the Dunkirk evacuation, he was credited with damaging two Messerschmitt Bf 110 fighter aircraft of ZG 26 before being shot down himself, probably by future ace Oberleutnant Günther Specht. He crash-landed his Spitfire and assumed that he was in friendly territory, so he had a cigarette. He surrendered to a German soldier who came by on a motorcycle.

Bushell became a prisoner of war and was sent to the Dulag Luft transit camp near Frankfurt with all the other captured aircrew.

== Prisoner of war ==
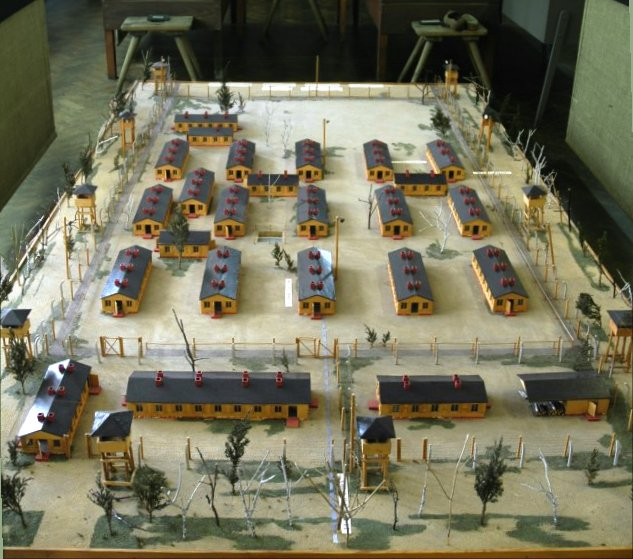
Stalag Luft III mockup.

On arrival at Dulag Luft, he was made part of the permanent British staff under the senior British officer Wing Commander Harry Day. The permanent staff's duty was to help newly captured Allied aircrew to adjust to life as prisoners of war.

Escape, which was regarded as an important duty of all prisoners of war of officer rank, was never far from his mind and, fortunately, he was in good company with Day and Fleet Air Arm pilot, Jimmy Buckley. Day placed Buckley in charge of escape operations, with Bushell as his deputy. The three of them formed the escape committee responsible for all escape attempts.

=== First escape ===
The permanent staff of the camp started several escape tunnels, one of which was completed in May 1941. Bushell was given a place in the tunnel but elected to escape on the same day as the tunnel break by cutting through the wire surrounding a small park in the camp grounds. His decision not to use the tunnel was to allow him an earlier getaway, thus enabling him to catch a particular train.

The exact date of the escape is not known but is believed to have occurred in June 1941. Bushell hid in a goat shed in the camp grounds and, as soon as it was dark enough, he crawled to the wire and made good his escape.

Bushell was recaptured some time later on the Swiss border, only a few hundred yards from freedom, by a German border guard. He was treated well and returned to Dulag Luft before being transferred to Stalag Luft I with all the 17 others who had escaped in the tunnel (including Day and Buckley).

Bushell was at Stalag Luft I for only a short period before being transferred to Oflag X-C at Lübeck. At this camp, he participated in the construction of another tunnel, but this was abandoned unfinished when the camp was evacuated.

=== Second escape ===
All British and Commonwealth officer POWs were removed from the camp on 8 October 1941 and were entrained for transfer to Oflag VI-B at Warburg.

During the night of 8/9 October 1941, the train stopped briefly in Hannover, where Bushell and Czechoslovak Pilot Officer Jaroslav Zafouk jumped from the train and escaped, unnoticed at the time by the German guards. Earlier in the journey, six other officers had escaped by jumping off the train while it was moving slowly; one was immediately recaptured and one officer was killed when he fell under the wheels.

Bushell and Zafouk made their way to Prague in German-occupied Czechoslovakia. Using Zafouk's contacts, they made contact with the Zeithammel family – Otto, his son, Otokar, and his daughter, Blazena — who were known to the Czech underground movement. The two airmen stayed with the Zeithammels in their apartment in the Smichov area of the city while the family tried to make arrangements for their onward journey. Bushell and Zafouk remained with the family for nearly eight months, and Bushell developed a relationship with Blazena. In mid-May 1942, the RAF officers were betrayed by a former Czech soldier called Miroslav Kraus, who had had an affair with Blazena some years previously and was working as a Gestapo informer. The British officers were arrested on May 19, and questioned at Gestapo headquarters, a building known as the Petschek Palace. Bushell was then sent to Stalag Luft III at Sagan, while Zafouk continued to be held in Prague.

After the assassination of Reinhard Heydrich, a very senior commander of the SS and acting Reich Protector of occupied Bohemia and Moravia, in Prague on May 27, Bushell was taken from the cells at Stalag Luft III to Berlin for further questioning by the Gestapo who suspected his involvement in the killing of Heydrich. He was returned to Sagan in October but told he would be shot if he ever fell into the Gestapo's hands again. Zafouk also underwent further questioning in Prague and was eventually sent to Oflag IV-C at Colditz. The Zeithammels were shot with other members of the Czech underground on June 30.

At Stalag Luft III, Bushell took over control of the escape organization from Jimmy Buckley, who was being transferred to another camp in Poland. Known as "Big X", he masterminded the building of three big tunnels known as Tom, Dick and Harry, the production and accumulation of escape material, the introduction of layers of security, and the gathering of military intelligence, which was sent to London in coded letters. Burning with hatred after witnessing the terror and suffering inflicted by the Nazis in occupied Prague, and the methods of the Gestapo at first hand, he was determined to wage war from within the camp and strike back at the Germans. In what became popularly known as the "Great Escape", he planned to disrupt the Nazi war effort by getting 200 men out in one night.

=== The Great Escape ===
In the spring of 1943, Bushell masterminded a plot for a major escape from the camp. Being held in the north compound where British airmen were housed, Bushell as commander of the escape committee channeled the escape effort into probing for weaknesses and looking for opportunities. Falling back on his legal background to advocate for his scheme, Bushell called a meeting of the escape committee in the camp and not only shocked those present with its scope, but injected into every man a passionate and driven determination to put every energy into the escape. He declared,

Everyone here in this room is living on borrowed time. By rights, we should all be dead! The only reason that God allowed us this extra ration of life is so we can make life hell for the Hun... In North Compound we are concentrating our efforts on completing and escaping through one master tunnel. No private enterprise tunnels are allowed. Three bloody deep, bloody long tunnels will be dug – Tom, Dick and Harry. One will succeed!

The simultaneous digging of these tunnels would become an advantage if any one of them were discovered by the Germans because the guards would scarcely imagine that another two could be well under way. The most radical aspect of the plan was not merely the scale of the construction, but also the sheer number of men that Bushell intended to pass through these tunnels. Previous attempts had involved the escape of anything up to twenty men, but Bushell was proposing to get over 200 out, each of whom would be wearing civilian clothes and possessing a complete range of forged papers and escape equipment. It was an unprecedented undertaking which would require unparalleled organization. As the mastermind of the Great Escape, Bushell inherited the codename of "Big X". The tunnel "Tom" began in a darkened corner of a hall in one of the buildings. "Harry"'s entrance was hidden under a stove. The entrance to "Dick" had a concealed entrance in a drainage sump. More than 600 prisoners were involved in their construction.

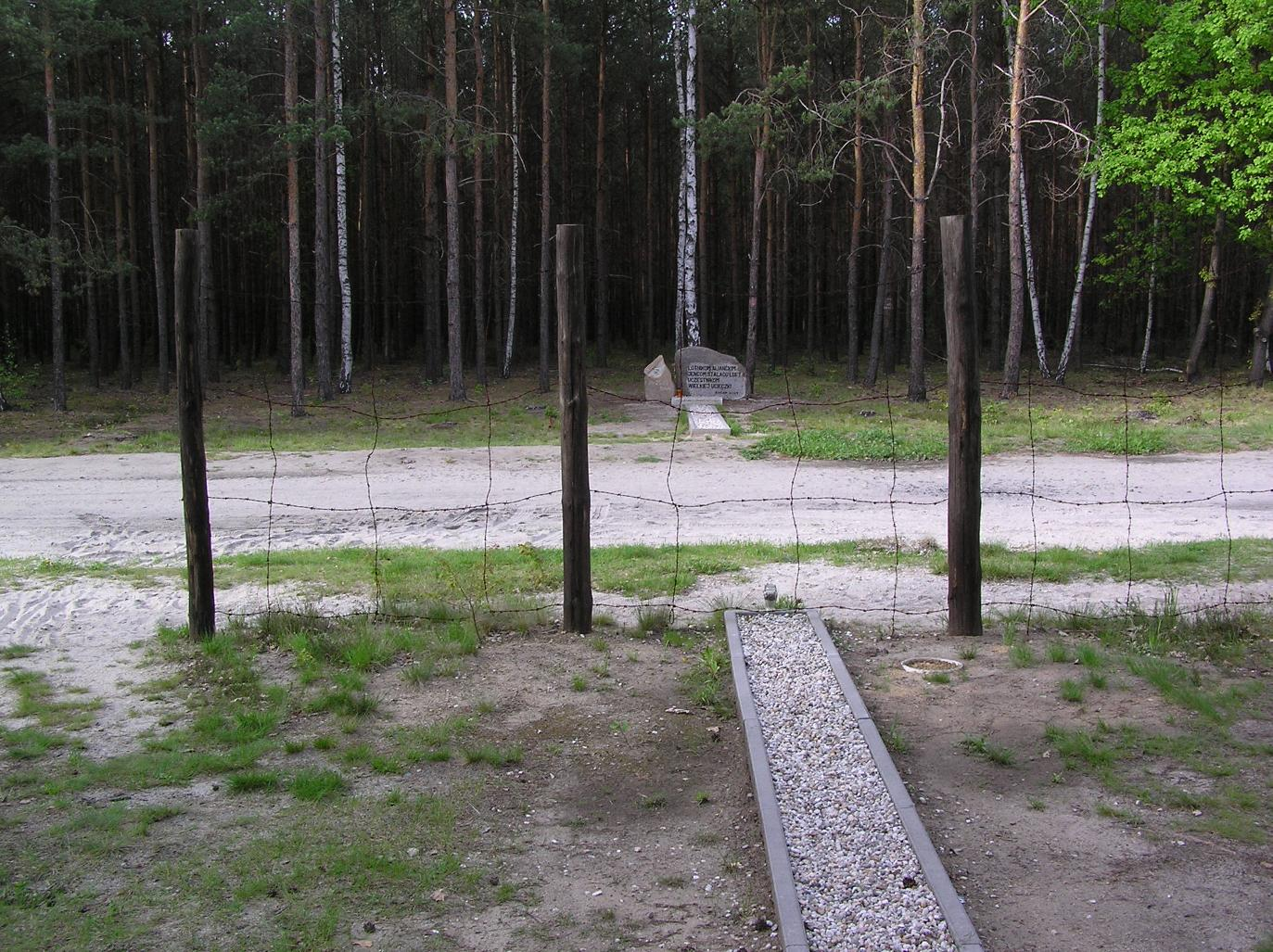
End of "Harry" tunnel showing how close the exit was to the camp fence

Tom was discovered in August 1943 when nearing completion. Bushell also organized another mass breakout, which occurred on 12 June 1943. This became known as the Delousing Break, when 26 officers escaped by leaving the camp under escort with two fake guards (POWs disguised as guards) supposedly to go to the showers for delousing in the neighboring compound. All but two were later recaptured and returned to the camp, with the remaining two officers being sent to Oflag IV-C at Colditz for attempting to steal an aircraft.

After the discovery of Tom, construction on Harry was halted, but it resumed in January 1944. On the evening of 24 March, after months of preparation, 200 officers prepared to escape. But things did not go as planned, with only 76 officers managing to get clear of the camp.

Bushell and his partner, Bernard Scheidhauer, among the first few to leave the tunnel, successfully boarded a train at Sagan railway station. They were caught the next day at Saarbrücken railway station, waiting for a train to Alsace.

On March 29, under the pretext of being driven back to a prison camp, the car carrying Bushell and Scheidhauer stopped for a rest break at the side of the autobahn near Ramstein, Germany (just outside today's Ramstein Air Base). It was during this stop that they were murdered by members of the Gestapo, including Emil Schulz, helped by others. This was a breach of the ratified and accepted 1929 Geneva Convention on Prisoners of War and thus constituted a war crime. The perpetrators were later tried and executed by the Allies. Fifty of the 76 escapees were killed in the Stalag Luft III murders on the personal orders of Adolf Hitler.

Memorial to "The Fifty" near Żagań, Bushell R.J. on left column

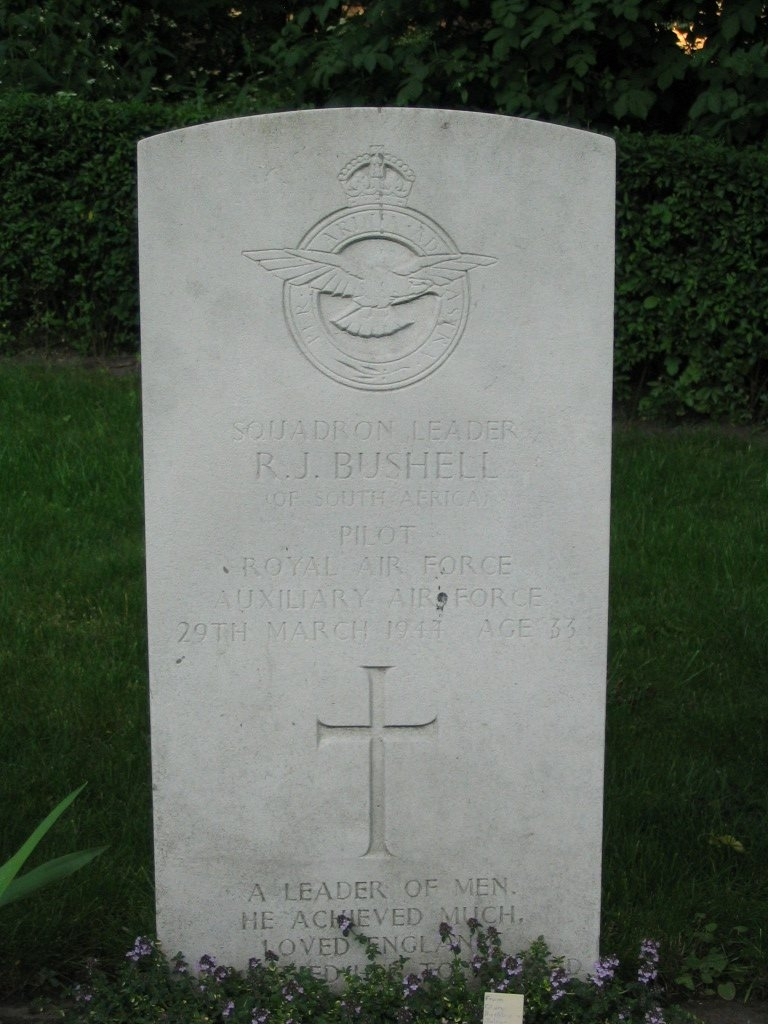
Gravestone of R.J. Bushell in Poznań, Poland

Bushell is buried at the Poznan Old Garrison Cemetery (Coll. grave 9. A.) in present-day Poznań, Poland. He was posthumously mentioned in despatches on 8 June 1944 for his services as a POW. This award was recorded in the London Gazette dated 13 June 1946.

== Personal life ==
In 1934, Bushell had fallen in love with Georgiana Curzon, but her father forced her into an unhappy marriage with someone else; the marriage ended in divorce in 1943, during Bushell's captivity. Bushell never forgot Curzon and it has been said that he was telling his fellow prisoners that "Georgie" was his true love and that he would one day marry her. For years after Bushell's death, Curzon placed an "In Memoriam" advertisement in The Times of London on his birthday, saying "Love is Immortal, Georgie". Words in similar vein are referred to in an article in The Times in 2013, by Simon Pearson, about Bushell's lovers. Pearson remarked that he had some years before, while working at The Times, come:

. . . across a memorial notice in the archive, which marked the anniversary of Roger Bushell's birth and celebrated his life. It quoted Rupert Brooke: "He leaves a white unbroken glory, a gathered radiance, a width, a shining peace, under the night." It was signed "Georgie".

== Memorials ==
Bushell Green in Bushey is named in his honour, one of a number of streets in the area named after Battle of Britain pilots.

Bushell's name also appears on the war memorial in Hermanus, South Africa, where his parents spent their last years and where they were buried. In 2017, a memorial was erected close to the location of his murder outside what is now the North Atlantic Treaty Organization (NATO) / United States Air Force military installation of the Ramstein Air Base.

== Legacy ==
Bushell was the basis for the character "Roger Bartlett" in the film The Great Escape (1963), played by actor Richard Attenborough.

Bushell has been portrayed by Ian McShane in the made-for-TV film The Great Escape II: The Untold Story (1988).

== See also ==
- Bram van der Stok
- Douglas Bader
- Herbert Massey
- Jens Müller (pilot)
- List of German World War II POW camps
- Per Bergsland
