= Listed buildings in Lund, East Riding of Yorkshire =

Lund is a civil parish in the county of the East Riding of Yorkshire, England. It contains nine listed buildings that are recorded in the National Heritage List for England. Of these, one is listed at Grade II*, the middle of the three grades, and the others are at Grade II, the lowest grade. The parish contains the village of Lund and the surrounding area. All the listed buildings are in the village, and consist of houses and associated structures, a church, a market cross and a telephone kiosk.

== Key ==
Grade	Criteria
II*	Particularly important buildings of more than special interest
II	Buildings of national importance and special interest

== Buildings ==
Name and location	Photograph	Date	Notes	Grade
All Saints' Church; 53.92036°N 0.52427°W		15th century	The oldest part of the church is the tower, with the rest of the church rebuilt in the 19th century, including the chancel by R. D. Chantrell in 1845–46. It is built in stone with a tile roof, and consists of a nave, a north aisle, a south porch, a chancel with a north vestry, and a west tower. The tower has two stages, a moulded plinth, diagonal buttresses, a three-light pointed west window with a hood mould and a statue above, a small trefoil-headed window, two-light pointed bell openings with hood moulds, and an embattled parapet.	II*
Market Cross; 53.91981°N 0.52395°W		Late medieval	The oldest part is the base, with the shaft dating from 1755. It is in limestone, and has a three-stepped plinth and a cubital base, on which is a four-sided tapering shaft with a finial.	II
Gateway and garden wall, The Manor House; 53.92001°N 0.52284°W		17th century	The gateway is in limestone, and consists of a moulded round arch with a pendant on moulded jambs, and imposts under a pediment containing a blank oval, and finials. The flanking garden wall is in red brick, with ramps and saddleback brick coping.	II
The Manor House; 53.92047°N 0.52283°W	—	Late 17th to early 18th century	The house is in brick, with a floor band, a timber eaves cornice, bracketed eaves, and a tile roof with raised coped gables. There are two storeys, and an L-shaped plan, with a front range of five bays and a rear wing. On the rear wing is a 20th-century two-storey porch. In the centre of the front range is a doorway and a porch, above which is a limestone sundial over a blank opening. The windows are cross-mullions with flat gauged brick arches.	II
Ivy House; 53.91998°N 0.52467°W		Mid-18th century	The house is in red brick, with a floor band, a dentilled eaves cornice, and a pantile roof with tumbled-in brick to the raised gables. There are two storeys and three bays, the middle bay projecting slightly. The central doorway has a divided fanlight, and the windows are sashes, those on the ground floor with flat gauged brick arches.	II
5 and 7 North Road; 53.92085°N 0.52472°W	—	Late 18th century	The house, which was refronted in the 19th century, is in red brick with a hipped pantile roof. There are two storeys and four bays. On the front is a projecting porch, to its right is a horizontally sliding sash window, to its left is a mullioned and transomed window, and further to the left is a 20th-century top-opening light. The upper floor contains four sash windows, the right two horizontally sliding. Inside, there is a large inglenook fireplace.	II
35 North Road; 53.92269°N 0.52409°W	—	Late 18th century	The house is in red brick with a pantile roof. There are two storeys, three bays, and a continuous rear outshut. The doorway is in the centre, and the windows are sashes.	II
Lund House; 53.92228°N 0.52351°W	—	Late 18th century	A vicarage, extended in 1814, it is in red brick with a hipped stone slate roof. The main block has two storeys and three bays. The central doorway has pilasters, a fanlight with radial glazing, and a projecting hood on fluted brackets. This is flanked by canted bay windows, and on the upper floor are sash windows under cambered wedge lintels.	II
Telephone kiosk 53.92000°N 0.52360°W		1935	The telephone kiosk on Lockington Road is of the K6 type designed by Giles Gilbert Scott. Constructed in cast iron with a square plan and a dome, it has three unperforated crowns in the top panels.	II
