= Bill Ash =

British writer and broadcaster (1917–2014)

Bill Ash MBE
- Born: William Franklin Ash; 30 November 1917; Dallas, Texas, U.S.
- Died: 26 April 2014 (aged 96); London, England
- Education: University of Texas; Balliol College, Oxford
- Occupations: Writer and broadcaster
- Spouses: Patricia Rambault, m. 1946, div; Ranjana Sidhanta, m. 1955
- Writing career
- Language: English
- Genre: Novels

William Franklin Ash MBE (30 November 1917 – 26 April 2014) was an American-born British writer, broadcaster and Marxist, who served as a fighter pilot with the Royal Canadian Air Force in World War II. He was shot down, made a prisoner of war, and was noted as an escaper.

== Early life ==
Born into a lower-middle-class family in Dallas, Texas, United States, Ash was a migrant worker during the Great Depression, and graduated from the University of Texas with a BA degree in liberal arts, writing privileged pupils' essays to gain money and also for his personal development as an author. Around this time, the Spanish Civil War broke out, and the largely apolitical Ash, driven by a hatred of bullies and fascism, decided that if the war was still going when he turned 21, being old enough to fight, he would join the Abraham Lincoln Brigade.

== World War II service ==
Ash enlisted in the Royal Canadian Air Force at Windsor, Ontario, on 22 June 1940. He did his basic training at No.1 Initial Training School from 20 July 1940, and he was promoted to leading aircraftman on graduation on 14 October 1940. Having been accepted for pilot training, Ash was posted to No.12 Elementary Flying Training School, from where he graduated on 30 November 1940. Posted to No. 31 Service Flying Training School, he learned to fly single-engine fighters. On graduation, he was commissioned on 25 March 1941. Ash was assigned to Embarkation Depot on 3 April 1941 for the voyage to England, where he completed a period with Operational Training Unit before joining No. 411 Squadron RCAF. He flew Spitfires in many defensive and offensive missions, including an attack on the German battleships Scharnhorst and Gneisenau. In 1942, he flew in "Big Wing" fighter sweeps over France with No. 411 Squadron RCAF.

=== Prisoner of war ===
On one of these missions to attack Comines Power Station on 24 March 1942, flying Supermarine Spitfire Mark Vb (serial number "AB281") from RAF Hornchurch, Ash was one of three of the squadron's pilots shot down by Jagdgeschwader 26 he crash-landed at Vieille-Église, about 15 miles from Calais, and was smuggled by the French Resistance to Lille and onward to Paris. He was arrested in Paris at the end of May 1942 and imprisoned at Oflag XXI-B, Szubin. In September 1942, he exchanged identities with an army private and joined a fatigue party, from which he escaped, only to be recaptured the same night. In the spring of 1943, Flight Lieutenant Ash and 32 others escaped from Oflag XXI-B through the latrine tunnel with Harry Day and Peter Stevens. With a companion, he tried to reach Warsaw, but was recaptured four days later. Shortly afterwards, he was transferred to Stalag Luft III, Sagan, where he was an active member of the escape committee. For the next 21 months, when other ranks were being transferred from Sagan to Stalag Luft VI, Heydekrug, Ash changed his identity and accompanied them. Under his direction, a tunnel was later made for a mass escape, but the tunnel was discovered when 10 prisoners had got away. Ash continued the attempt and eventually gained his freedom. He boarded a goods train for Kovno, but was discovered by station guards and returned to Sagan.

His de-briefing after liberation from captivity in April 1945 records the places where he was imprisoned as Dulag Luft (Oberusel) for about three days in June 1942, then Stalag Luft III at Sagan from June to September 1942, Oflag XXI-B (Schubin), where he was held from September 1942 to April 1943, back to Stalag Luft III for April and May 1943, and then Stalag Luft VI (Heydekrug) from May to August 1943 before return to Stalag Luft III for the period August 1943 to January 1945 and finally the naval camp Marlag Milag Nord at Westertimke from January to April 1945.

Ash was reportedly twice sentenced to death as a spy. On one of these occasions the Luftwaffe successfully argued that they should have custody of Ash because he was an airman, thereby taking him from the Gestapo who had sentenced him to death.

On 17 May 1946, Ash was appointed Member of the Order of the British Empire (MBE) for his escaping activities. He ended the war as a flight lieutenant.

== In Britain ==
Demobilised back in England at war's end, Ash had to face the fact that "taking the King's shilling" in 1939 had robbed him of his US citizenship and that he was now a stateless person. (His memoir Under the Wire, published in 2005, makes it clear that Ash knew when signing up in Canada that this was a price he had to pay.) He acquired British citizenship and went up to Balliol College, Oxford, on a veteran's scholarship, to read PPE. He then joined the BBC, working alongside a young Tony Benn, who became a lifelong friend. Sent to India as the corporation's main representative on the subcontinent, Ash was influenced by Nehru's brand of socialism, and by the time he returned to Britain in the late 1950s his politics had solidified into a hard-boiled Marxism. He became involved in left-wing "street politics", including the post-war anti-fascist movement, but his late-blooming revolutionary tendencies eventually proved too much for the BBC, which fired him – though he managed to cling on to freelance employment in the radio drama department as a script reader.

Beginning in the 1960s, Ash wrote a series of novels, including Choice of Arms (1962) and Ride a Paper Tiger (1969). Politics, however, remained his chief interest. Finding him too quirky and individualistic, the Communist Party rejected his application for membership, and he co-founded the Communist Party of Britain (Marxist–Leninist). He also brought his academic background to bear on the subject, publishing a study entitled Marxist Morality. In later life, Ash served for several years as chairman of the Writers' Guild of Great Britain and helped to encourage young writers through his work as a script reader for BBC Radio and later as literary manager at the Soho Theatre. His book The Way to Write Radio Drama remained the best on the subject for more than 20 years. Later, he was able to work as a freelancer for the BBC's radio drama department as a script reader.

== Personal life ==
Ash's first marriage, in 1946 to Patricia Rambault – with whom he had a son and a daughter – was dissolved. In 1955, he married his second wife, Ranjana Sidhanta (1924–2015).

He died at the age of 96 in London on 26 April 2014.

== Bibliography ==
In addition to numerous articles in Marxist journals, Ash is the author of the following books:

=== Fiction ===
- The Lotus in the Sky (1961), London: Hutchinson, OCLC 247244809
- Choice of Arms (1962), London: Hutchinson, OCLC 916603735
- The Longest Way Round (1963), London: Hutchinson, OCLC 605896004
- Ride a Paper Tiger (1969), New York: Walker, OCLC 5415
- Take-Off (1970), New York: Walker, OCLC 56644
- Incorporated (1980), Brighton: Harvester Press, ISBN 9780855273187, OCLC 6692711
- Right Side Up (1984), London: Howard Baker, ISBN 9780703002662, OCLC 11724862
- Bold Riot. G. Mann, 1992. ISBN 9780704102484, OCLC 27383315
- What's the Big Idea (993), Bristol: George Mann, OCLC 639089517
- But My Fist is Free (1997), Maidstone Mann, ISBN 9780704102651, OCLC 833314431
- Rise Like Lions (1998), Maidstone Mann, ISBN 9780704102712, OCLC 833593264
- Heroes In The Evening Mist (2018), New Internationalist, ISBN 9781780264738

=== Non-fiction ===
- Marxism and Moral Concepts (1964), New York: Monthly Review Press. OCLC 219859725
- Pickaxe and Rifle : the Story of the Albanian People (1974), London: Howard Baker ISBN 9780703000392, OCLC 490799167
- Morals and Politics : the Ethics of Revolution (1977), London/Boston: Routledge & Kegan Paul, ISBN 0-7100-8558-3
- A Red Square, The Autobiography of an Unconventional Revolutionary (1978), London: Howard Baker, ISBN 0-7030-0157-4
- Marxist Morality (1988), London: Howard Baker Press Ltd, ISBN 978-0703003133
- Under the Wire: The Wartime Memoir of a Spitfire Pilot, Legendary Escape Artist, Cooler King (with Brendan Foley) (2005), hardback Bantam Press, ISBN 0-593-05408-3
- Workers' Politics, the Ethics of Socialism (1998; 2007), Aakar Books, India, ISBN 9780954211264, OCLC 432404342

=== About William Ash's novels ===
- Doug Nicholls, Class Writer, An Introduction to the Novels of William Ash (2002), Coventry: Bread Books, ISBN 0-9542112-1-9

=== Biographies ===
- Ash, William, with Foley, Brendan (2006). Under the Wire. London: Bantam (Autobiography) (published 5 June 2006). ISBN 978-0-553-81711-9.
- Bishop, Patrick (3 September 2015). The Cooler King: The True Story of William Ash, Spitfire Pilot, PoW and WW2's Greatest Escaper. London: Atlantic Books. ISBN 978-1-78239-022-0.
