= Harry Day =

Royal Air Force pilot (1898-1977)

Group Captain Harry Day GC DSO OBE
- Group Captain Harry Day
- Born: 3 August 1898; Kingdom of Sarawak (now Sarawak, Malaysia)
- Died: 11 March 1977 (aged 78); Malta
- Relatives: George Fiott Day (great-uncle)
- Military career
- Allegiance: United Kingdom
- Branch: Royal Marines (1916–30); Royal Air Force (1930–50)
- Service years: 1916–1950
- Rank: Group Captain
- Nickname: Wings
- Commands: No. 23 Squadron RAF; No. 57 Squadron RAF
- Conflicts: First World War; Second World War
- Awards: George Cross; Distinguished Service Order; Officer of the Order of the British Empire; Officer of the Legion of Merit (United States)

Harry Melville Arbuthnot Day, GC, DSO, OBE (3 August 1898 – 11 March 1977) was a Royal Marine and later a Royal Air Force pilot during the Second World War. As a prisoner of war, he was senior British officer in a number of camps and a noted escapee.

== Early life ==
Day was born in Sarawak on Borneo on 3 August 1898, and grew up there. His grandfather had been a major in the 66th Foot before forming a private army for Charles Brooke, the second White Rajah of Sarawak. The army became known as the Sarawak Rangers. Day's father joined the Rajah's service and became a Sarawak resident.

Day's great-uncle was George Fiott Day, who had won the Victoria Cross during the Crimean War. He is also a descendant of George Miller Bligh, who was an officer on HMS Victory during the Battle of Trafalgar.

Day was sent to England and was educated at Haileybury College, where he joined the Officers Training Corps. While on manoeuvres, he was wounded when shot in the back with a blank cartridge.

Day joined the Royal Marines in 1916 and was commissioned as a second lieutenant on 31 August.

== First World War ==
Day served with a Royal Marine detachment on the battleship HMS Britannia. He was promoted to temporary lieutenant on 26 September 1917.

On 9 November 1918, two days before the armistice, the ship was torpedoed and sunk. Day distinguished himself by twice returning below deck, through smoke and flames, to rescue two injured men trapped inside, including the wardroom steward. For this act of bravery, Day was awarded the Albert Medal (sea, second class). In 1971, all Albert Medal holders became eligible to exchange their award for a George Cross, which Day did.

== Inter war years ==
Day was promoted to lieutenant on 26 September 1919, with effect from 26 September 1917. His first command was with a marine detachment on HMS Isis, an Eclipse-class cruiser, before joining HMS Malaya.

Later Day commanded the marine detachment of HMS Caledon at the burning of Smyrna, helping to evacuate Greek survivors of the Turkish massacres. He also saw service with the fleet during the League of Nations involvement at Memel.

Day stayed with the Royal Marines until 1924, when he moved to the Fleet Air Arm. On 16 June 1924, he received a temporary commission as a flying officer in the Royal Air Force while on a four-year attachment. He was promoted to flight lieutenant on 1 July 1928 before receiving a permanent commission in the same rank on 21 June 1930 (seniority from 1 July).

Day joined No. 23 Squadron RAF flying Gloster Gamecocks, with which he led the RAF Synchronised Aerobatics Display Team, which included Douglas Bader at the 1931 Hendon Air Show, and other displays. He held posts at RAF Abu Sueir and Khartoum, was promoted to squadron leader on 1 August 1936, holding commands at Aboukir and Netheravon before commanding the Advanced Flying Training School at Little Rissington.

When war was imminent Day was promised a staff job at RAF Bomber Command headquarters, but he requested to join an operational squadron. This was approved, and on 1 July 1939 he was promoted to wing commander and placed in command of No. 57 Squadron RAF, stationed at RAF Upper Heyford.

== Second World War ==
Day was over 40 when the Second World War began, and with No. 57 Squadron he moved to Metz as part of the air component of the British Expeditionary Force, which was equipped with the Bristol Blenheim light bomber. He volunteered to carry out the squadron's first operational mission, a flight from Metz to reconnoitre Hamm-Hannover-Soest on 13 October 1939. His Blenheim, L1138, was shot down by a Messerschmitt Bf 109 flown by Unteroffizier Stephan Lutjens, of 11./JG 53 near Birkenfeld. Day bailed out, suffering burns to his face and hands, but otherwise landed safely by parachute. He was immediately captured by the Germans and placed in the custody of Luftwaffe doctor Hermann Gauch. His two crew-mates, Sergeant E.B. Hillier and AC1 F.G. Moller were killed.

== Prisoner of war ==
Upon his capture, Day became a prisoner of war. He spent a few days at a German Army hospital having his burns treated before spending two weeks at a small camp at Oberursel (which later became known as Dulag Luft). He was then sent to Oflag IX-A/H at Spangenberg, arriving there at the end of October. He took over the role of senior British officer at this camp and became responsible for the well-being of the handful of British RAF prisoners who had entered captivity so early in the war. Day, with six RAF and five French POWs, left Oflag IX-A/H in December 1939 to be sent to Dulag Luft near Oberursel to become a 'permanent' staff at this new transit camp.

=== Dulag Luft ===
Day, again due to his seniority in rank, held the post of senior British officer and also headed the permanent staff whose job was to help newly captured aircrew adapt to life as prisoners of war. Until the Norwegian Campaign began in April 1940, very few prisoners entered the camp, and life was fairly relaxed. Day got on well with the German commandant, Major Rumpel. The permanent staff were also allowed out on parole walk and enjoyed ample Red Cross food and a good relationship with the German guards. This 'privileged friendliness' caused suspicion with newly captured RAF aircrew who passed through the camp, and many accusations of collaboration were made against Day and his other colleagues.

In fact, Day had been sending intelligence back home in coded letters, and together with other members of the permanent staff, including Roger Bushell, Jimmy Buckley and Johnnie Dodge, he had been active in construction of a tunnel, starting from under his bed, which was completed in the spring of 1941.

In June 1941, Day and 17 others tunnelled out of the camp. This was the first mass escape of the war. Day travelled on foot alone, aiming to walk down the Moselle Valley and into France, but was recaptured five days later, looking like a tramp. All the escapers were recaptured and after spending a few days in jail at Frankfurt am Main, were transferred to Stalag Luft I. Major Rumpel congratulated Day on his attempt.

=== Stalag Luft I ===
Day arrived at Stalag Luft I in July 1941 and immediately took over the role of senior British officer. Any suspicions felt about Day from his time at Dulag Luft were quickly dissolved when the other inmates of the camp learnt of his exploits. At this camp, Day set up an escape organisation, headed by Jimmy Buckley, by which all escape attempts, intelligence gathering and escape preparations were controlled. This organisation became the model used at all other allied POW camps for the remainder of the war.

Day partly oversaw a mass escape attempt in August 1941 when 12 officers tried to escape using a tunnel; however, the escape was discovered as the third person left the exit, and all three escapers were recaptured.

=== Stalag Luft III and Oflag XXI-B ===
When Stalag Luft I was closed in March 1942, Day and all RAF inmates were transferred to the east compound at the newly built Stalag Luft III at Sagan (Żagań). Here he made a second escape attempt using a forged interpreter's pass. While in solitary confinement after that attempt, he tried a third escape but was again recaptured.

In October 1942, Day was sent to Oflag XXI-B at Szubin in German-occupied Poland where in March 1943 he escaped through the latrine tunnel with William Ash, Peter Stevens, Aidan Crawley and others. This time Day headed east to Poland, hoping to get on a ship to Sweden. He was recaptured and sent back to Szubin, before being transferred back to Sagan.

=== Stalag Luft III and the Great Escape ===
Together with Roger Bushell, he planned and organised the "Great Escape". On 24 March 1944, Day and 75 others escaped and he made his way to Stettin (Szczecin). Disguised in a tailored uniform to look like a civilian suit, together with another escapee (Pawel Tobolski), who was dressed as a German soldier, the pair travelled by train, through Berlin, reaching Stettin on the evening of the next day. There they sought help from some French workers and were taken to a workers' camp. However, they were betrayed by an informer in the camp and arrested the following day.

After a brief stay in the local jail, Day was taken to Berlin and was interviewed by Arthur Nebe, the man who selected the 50 escapers to be murdered, which included Tobolski. Day was spared execution. Day later said that Hitler had ordered his execution personally, but that Hermann Göring had asked him to relent because Day and his family were so well known to the public.

=== Sachsenhausen concentration camp and Tyrol ===
After interrogation by the Gestapo, he was sent to Sachsenhausen concentration camp, from where he and four others (including three survivors from the Great Escape) achieved another tunnel escape. After another visit to Gestapo headquarters, he was held in solitary confinement in the death cells at Sachsenhausen.

In February 1945, Day was transferred to Dachau via Flossenburg. In April 1945, he was transferred to South Tyrol together with other prominent prisoners. He made one final escape attempt in the final weeks of the war when the prisoners had limited freedom within the city limits while being held in Villa Bassa (now Niederdorf). On 28 April, Day stole a Volkswagen and drove to the Allied lines where he informed the Allied Forces of the hostage situation in Tyrol. However, the following day, one of the German prisoners, Colonel von Bonin, telephoned Captain Wichard von Alvensleben in nearby Bozen, asking him to send his Wehrmacht unit to Villa Bassa to protect the prisoners from the SS guards. The Wehrmacht troops freed the hostages on 30 April after forcing their guards to flee.

For his services while a prisoner, Day was awarded the Distinguished Service Order and appointed an Officer of the Order of the British Empire. He was also awarded the United States Legion of Merit in the degree of Officer for his services to American POWs.

== Later life ==
Day was promoted to group captain in 1946, before retiring from service in 1950. He acted as technical adviser for the films Reach for the Sky and The Great Escape.

The book Wings Day by Sydney Smith is an account of Day's exploits as a prisoner of war. Smith was also a POW and was held with Day for several years. Day also features in Reach for the Sky, the biography of Douglas Bader by Paul Brickhill; and The Great Escape, also by Brickhill. He was the subject of the television programme This Is Your Life in November 1961.

Married to Margo, Day lived mainly on the Isle of Wight or at 6 Trevor Square, London. He died in the Blue Sisters Hospital, Malta, on 11 March 1977, aged 78.
