= Stalag Luft I =

Nazi prisoner-of-war camp in Barth, Germany during World War II

- Barth, Western Pomerania

Site information
- Type: Prisoner-of-war camp
- Controlled by: Nazi Germany

Location
- Barth, Germany (pre-war borders, 1937)
- Coordinates: 54°22′25″N 12°42′31″E

Site history
- In use: 1940–1945

Garrison information
- Garrison: 900 officers and men
- Occupants: RAF, RAAF, SAAF, USAAF, and RCAF POWs

Stalag Luft I was a German World War II prisoner-of-war (POW) camp near Barth, Western Pomerania, Germany, for captured Allied airmen. The presence of the prison camp is said to have shielded the town of Barth from Allied bombing. About 9,000 airmen – 7,588 American and 1,351 British and Canadian – were imprisoned there when it was liberated on the night of 30 April 1945 by Soviet troops.

== Camp history ==
The camp was opened in 1941 to hold British officers, but was closed in April 1942, when they were transferred to other camps. It was reopened in October 1942, when 200 RAF NCOs from Stalag Luft III were moved there. From 1943, American POWs were sent to the camp.

Stalag Luft I consisted of a West Compound (also referred to as the South Compound) and North Nos. 1, 2, and 3 Compounds, separated by German quarters. According to Lt Col Charles Ross Greening, Senior Officer in North Camp 1, "Our barracks were rough, wood frame structures standing on small foundation posts about 8 to 10 inches off the ground. The Germans had dug a series of shallow trenches underneath the barracks to allow guard dogs to creep along and detect any tunnelers. Occasionally, the German guards themselves crawled into the trenches and listened to the conversations of the prisoners in their rooms." North No. 1 Compound had a mess hall, where bread, potatoes, and vegetables provided by the Germans were supplemented with food parcels supplied by the Red Cross. Greening states "The parcels included tins and packets of such items as jam, cheese, powdered milk, meat, sardines, margarine, raisins, chocolate, coffee, sugar, and crackers." An escape committee composed of senior camp officers approved all submitted escape plans. According to Greening, "In all, 140 tunnels were dug at Stalag Luft 1." The camp held about 9000 men prisoners.

=== Commanders ===
- Oberst Hartwig von Winckler, Mar. 40 to June 40
- Major Roland von Oertzen, June 40 to May 41
- Major Burkhardt, May 41 to Apr. 42
- Oberst Willibald Scherer, Oct. 42 to Jan. 45
- Oberst Gustav Warnstedt, Jan. 45 to Apr. 45

=== Evacuation ===
On 30 April 1945, the prisoners were ordered to evacuate the camp in the face of the advancing Soviet Red Army, but the Senior American Officer, Colonel Hubert Zemke, refused to give the order. After negotiations between Zemke and Commandant Oberst (Colonel) Gustav Warnstedt, it was agreed that to avoid useless bloodshed the guards would go, leaving the POWs behind. The next day, the first Soviet troops arrived.

The Soviet troops treated German civilians in the area badly, but American and Commonwealth personnel were treated with respect (the liberated POWs were careful to wear armbands on which their nationality was written in Russian). The Russian soldiers replaced the Germans as guards and locked the gates and refused the Allied soldiers to be evacuated; almost two weeks later a US Colonel showed up and threatened to shoot the Soviet Commander if he didn't allow his "Allies" to be released. He ordered the gates opened and the prisoners to be evacuated.

B-17 Bombers that had all of their armaments taken out were flown in and all remaining Allied prisoners were evacuated by air, between 13–15 May, in "Operation Revival".

British POWs were returned directly to Great Britain, while the Americans were sent to Camp Lucky Strike north-east of Le Havre, France, before being shipped back to the United States.

== In popular culture ==
The Stalag is the setting of the 2017 film Instrument of War, featuring Jack Ashton as 1st Lt. Clair William Cline (9/30-1917, Stearns Co., MN - 9/17/2010, Tacoma, Pierce Co., WA), a U.S. bomber pilot imprisoned at the camp from February 1944 to April 1945 who built a violin while a prisoner. The film also depicts the prisoners' refusal to evacuate and the negotiations between the Senior U.S. Officer and the Kommandant.

== Notable prisoners ==
- Nicholas Alkemade, RAF rear-gunner who survived a fall of 18,000 feet (5,500 m) without a parachute when his aircraft was shot down in March 1944.
- Bohdan Arct, squadron leader in the Royal Air Force and commander of No. 316 Polish Fighter Squadron, Polish fighter pilot of the Polish Air Forces in France and Great Britain in World War II, member the Polish Fighting Team in North Africa, and future writer.
- John L. Armstrong Sr, on 28 August 1944, was shot down while attacking a railway locomotive in his P-51 Mustang. On 3 September 1954, he flew a North American F-86 Sabre to take the world speed record over a 500-kilometre (310 mi) course, flying at 1,045.206 kilometres per hour (649.461 mph). He died two days later when his aircraft broke up during an attempt to increase his record.
- Bernard Barker, United States Air Force bombardier, later famous as a Watergate burglar.
- Lowell Bennett, American correspondent for the International News Service.
- Jimmy Buckley, British Fleet Air Arm pilot and escape organiser (known as "Big X" — note that a character in the film The Great Escape is also so named, but has a different fate).
- Josef Bryks, Czechoslovak RAFVR fighter pilot and serial escaper (September – November 1944).
- John J Carroll, P38 Pilot 55th Fighter Group, shot down over the Netherlands, 1943, Later Vice president of Knorr Broadcasting WKNR (KEENER13) Detroit. Later, Owner Operator of Carroll Broadcasting Inc.
- John M. Conroy, originator of the Pregnant Guppy transport aircraft and founder of Aero Spacelines
- John Cordner, RAF Lancaster Navigator, Later Headmaster of the Naval School, Singapore
- Roberta Cowell, RAF fighter pilot, and later the first British person to undergo Sex reassignment surgery
- Philip Crossman, the youngest pilot in the US Army Air Corp and later USAF Colonel; the Czech Republic erected a monument to Crossman and his crew for their defense of the city of Palacov
- Harry Day, British Royal Air Force Wing Commander and Senior British Officer at this and numerous other camps, survivor of the "Great Escape".
- Harry Besson, was shot down when flying 31/10/43 and captured. He was an RAF pilot born in Stamford Lincolnshire in 11/02/1921
- James 'Dixie' Deans, RAF sergeant and World War II bomber pilot, guided 2,000 Allied POWs across Germany in what was known as the "Long March".
- Robert J Duffy, USAAF 2nd Lt. B-24 Co-Pilot from Iowa City, Iowa. Became prominent attorney in Savannah, GA and author of the autobiography, "Every Step of the Way."
- Sonny Eliot, USAAF B-24 bomber pilot, later weatherman on WWJ (AM) 950 in Detroit, Michigan. Eliot did weather reports on both TV and/or radio since just after returning home from World War II.
- John Fancy, British, RAF air observer/navigator whose tunneling escapes from various German prisoner of war camps during the war earned him the nickname "The Mole", and inspired the book and film The Great Escape.
- Augustine Fernandez, career officer in the USAAF, bombardier in the B-17, author of the book POWerful memories.
- Bill Fowler, RAF pilot who later escaped from Oflag IV-C (Colditz Castle).
- Frank E. Funk, American navigator, 772nd Squadron, 463rd Bomb Group, 15th Air Force. Parachuted out of sabotaged B-17 on his seventh mission. Later dean of University College at Syracuse University, 1970-1988.
- Francis "Gabby" Gabreski, top American fighter ace in Europe in World War II, a jet fighter ace in * Korea, and career officer in the USAF with more than 26 years service. 61st Fighter Squadron Commander at time of capture.
- Vermont Garrison, USAAF, 1st Lt. P-51 pilot, with 7.3 victories. A F-86 Sabre double ace in Korea with 10 MiG-15 shot down. Vice commander of the 8th Tactical Fighter Wing, and flew a full tour of bombing and fighter missions over North Vietnam.
- John C. Giraudo, USAAF B-24 pilot, later became a POW a second time when he was shot down during the Korean War in 1953.
- Cornelius P. Gould Jr., 2nd Lt. P-51 Pilot and Tuskegee Airman from Pittsburgh, Pennsylvania. Later became the Founding President of the Ohio Chapter of Tuskegee Airmen, Inc.
- Charles Ross Greening, an American bomber pilot who participated in the Doolittle Raid.
- William F. Guillaum., 2nd Lt. B-25 Mitchell Bomber Pilot from Cannelton, Indiana. Flew 51 bombing missions and helped organize Stalag Luft I prisoner resistance.
- Van Hixson, USAAF 1st Lt. B-17 Pilot who later served as The Adjutant General of the Utah National Guard.
- Jimmy James, 9 Sqn RAF pilot and survivor of the "Great Escape".
- Hugh Lake Jameson, B-17 pilot who had played center for Clemson on the first Cotton Bowl (American football) game. His footlocker left behind in England was recovered by family members in 2012.
- Gerald W. Johnson Commander of the Eighth Air Force during the Vietnam War, 63d Fighter Squadron Commander at the time of capture.
- Lawrence N. Kalgreen, USAAF 2nd Lt. B-24 Pilot from Akron, Ohio. Later became president of the Akron Bearing Company.
- Nicolas Koskinas, Greek, Hellenic Air Force fighter pilot; became chief of the Hellenic Tactical Air Force Command in 1967.
- Mark Linenthal Jr, American navigator; later poet and professor San Francisco State University.
- James "Cookie" Long, 9 Sqn RAF pilot, later escaped from Stalag Luft III in "The Great Escape", but was recaptured and shot by the Gestapo.
- RA "Bob" Hoover, American fighter and test pilot, who escaped the camp and then stole a Focke-Wulf Fw 190 and flew it to Allied territory.
- Einar A. Malmstrom, 356th Fighter Group Commander and namesake of Malmstrom Air Force Base.
- Loren G. McCollom, 353rd Fighter Group Commander.
- John C. Morgan, ex-RAF bomber pilot and USAAF B-17 pilot, the only Medal of Honor recipient to become a POW in World War II.
- Brian Paddon, RAF pilot who later escaped from Oflag IV-C (Colditz Castle).
- Ray Parker, American pilot who from April 1944 to May 1945 edited POW WOW, an underground newspaper within the camp that distributed information of the outside world to the prisoners.
- Donald Pleasence, later known as an actor in such films as You Only Live Twice and Halloween. He also had roles in both The Great Escape and The Great Escape II: The Untold Story.
- Lt Col Luther H. Richmond, Commanding Officer of the 486th Fighter Squadron, 352nd Fighter Group, was downed by flak while attacking an anti-aircraft position in his P-51. He was a prisoner from April 15, 1944, until May 1945. He retired from the USAF as a Major General in 1970.
- John TL Shore, 9 Squadron RAF pilot, successfully escaped from Stalag Luft I, via 'blitzkrieg' tunnel under incinerator, on 19 Oct 1941 and made a home run to England via Sweden.
- Saul Sitzer, Career USAAF/USAF. WW2, Korea, Viet-Nam 357th FG 363 Fighter Squadron. On 2 Jan 45 crashed near Cologne in P-51 44-14490. Hit by ground fire on a low level strafing run (second pass over a train), AM w/ 3 Oak Leaf Cluster/ ETO w/ 2 stars. USAF Ret 1972 Lt Col.
- Brad "Buster" Slaven, child actor with numerous credits prior to the war and additional credits as an adult actor after the war. Retired from Western Airlines as a pilot.
- Joseph E. Smith, RAF pilot, survivor of several escape attempts and later a director of NHS Scotland.
- Johnny Smythe, Sierra-Leonean RAF navigator, later a Queen's Counsel and Attorney-General of Sierra Leone.
- Henry R. Spicer, sentenced to death for "inciting a riot". Scheduled to be executed the next day after the day the camp was liberated.
- Roy Wendell, PR director for Fairchild Republic Co., developed public relations strategies for A-10 Warthog, B-1 Lancer
- Don Widmark, USAAF, brother of Hollywood actor and western star Richard Widmark.
- Ian Waddy New Zealand fighter pilot; Squadron Leader of No. 486 Squadron RNZAF; shot down in a Typhoon on a "Ramrod" (bombing mission) over France.
- Hubert Zemke, career officer in the USAAF, fighter pilot in World War II, and a leading USAAF ace. He was the Senior Allied Officer in the camp at the time of liberation, and arranged for the POWs to remain in the camp instead of evacuating. 479th Fighter Group Commander at time of capture.
- Bernard Thomas Moynahan Jr., Second Lt. Navigator, shot down after being attacked by fighters on a mission to Brunswick, Germany on 21 Feb 1944 in B-17G 42-39814 that exploded in mid-air and crashed near Wunstorf, GR., nominated by President John F. Kennedy as Judge of the United States District Court for the Eastern District of Kentucky, becoming Chief Judge of the United States District Court for the Eastern District of Kentucky.

== See also ==
- List of prisoner-of-war camps in Germany

== Literature ==
- Martin Albrecht, Helga Radau: Stalag Luft I in Barth. Britische und amerikanische Kriegsgefangene in Pommern 1940 bis 1945. (English summary) Thomas Helms Verlag Schwerin 2012. ISBN 978-3-940207-70-8
