= Dulag Luft =

Prisoner of war camps

- Oberursel, Hesse
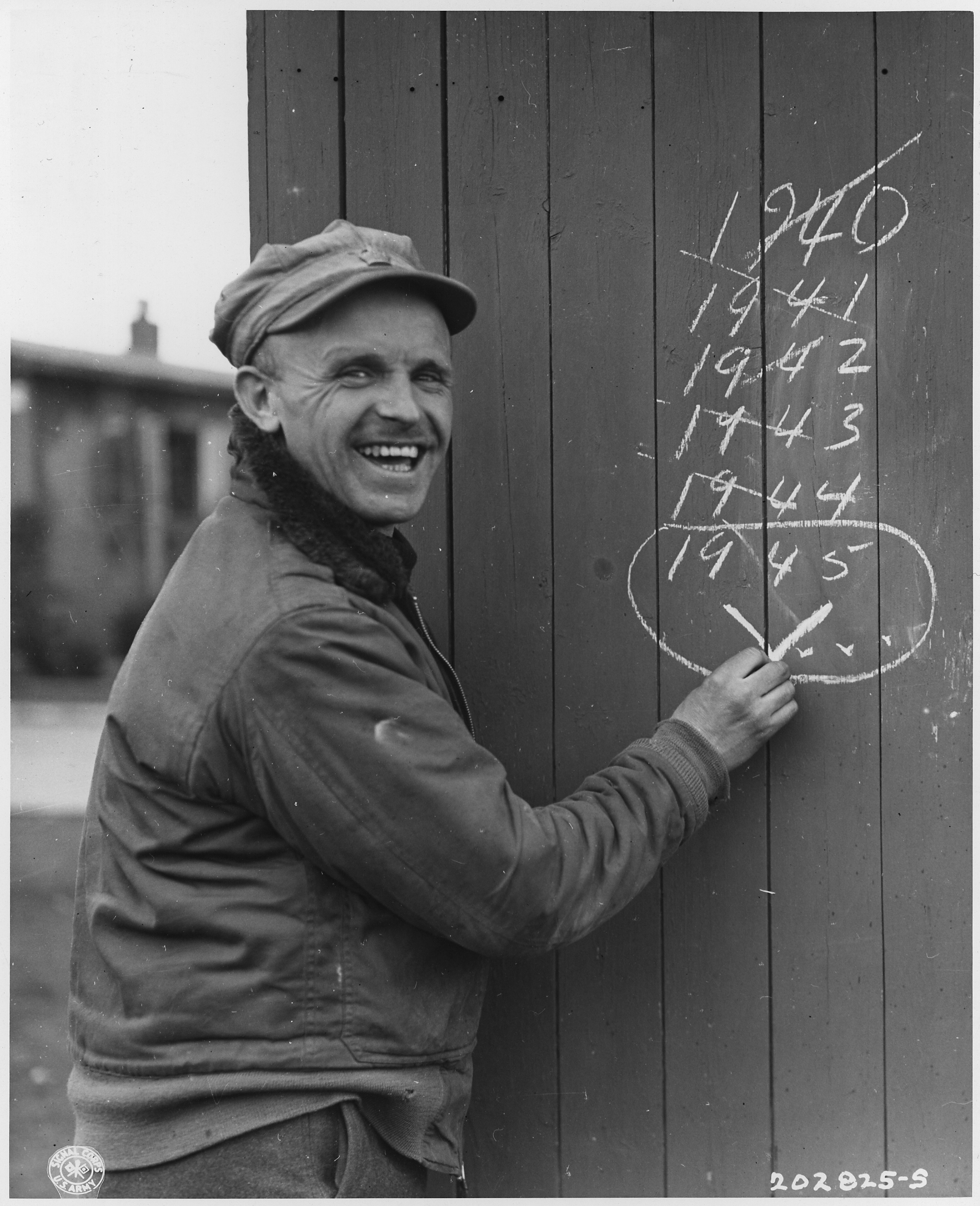
- Sgt. Edward Hill of Manchester, England, freed from five years of captivity at Dulag Luft, by the American Seventh Armored Division, First Army, c.29 March 1945

Site information
- Type: Prisoner-of-war camp
- Controlled by: Nazi Germany

Location
- Oberursel, Germany (pre-war borders, 1937)
- Coordinates: 50.21654°N 8.55366°E

Site history
- In use: 1939–1945

Garrison information
- Occupants: Allied aircrew

Dulag Luft (Durchgangslager der Luftwaffe, Transit Camp of the Airforce) were German Prisoner of War (POW) transit camps for captured airmen from any of the allied air forces during World War II. Their main purpose was to act as collection and interrogation centres for newly captured aircrew, before they were transferred in batches to the permanent camps.

Several camps were set up throughout Germany and the occupied countries, however the main centre used throughout the war was at Oberursel near Frankfurt. A satellite camp at Wetzlar was set up later in the war to help cope with the large numbers of aircrew captured as the bombing campaign intensified against Germany. Allegations of interrogation under torture have been made by numerous POWs who passed through the camps. After the war, five German Luftwaffe officers were prosecuted for abusing detainees.

The Germans had established a similar facility, the "Listening Hotel", in the First World War. This was located at 39 Ettlinger Strasse in Karlsruhe and was a former business hotel, the Europäischer Hof. The "Listening Hotel" should not be confused with the regular Officers' Camp in Karlsuhe in that war.

== Oberursel Camp ==
The camp was built on the site of an old government poultry farm, approximately 300 yards north of the main Frankfurt to Bad Homburg road. The camp first opened in December 1939 when a small number of British and French POWs were transferred in from Oflag IX-A/H. These first prisoners were to act as a permanent staff of the camp to help new POWs become accustomed to camp life. The main building, known as the stonehouse, had been used as a prison for a small number of airmen captured in the early months of the war, before it became a transit camp.

The stonehouse, which had been used to house farm pupils prior to its conversion to the prison camp, was originally the only building in the camp; however from April 1940 onwards the camp expanded with the completion of three wooden barrack blocks. After this point the stonehouse was used as the interrogation centre for new POWs, and the barrack blocks were used to house the permanent staff, POWs and other POWs awaiting transfer to other camps. The first Senior British Officer (SBO) was Wing Commander Harry Day. The camp steadily grew in size.

Post-war the site was taken over by the United States Army and renamed Camp King. It remained in use until 1993.

== Wetzlar Camp ==
Wetzlar Camp was located a few miles from Frankfurt and was opened towards the end of the war. This camp was mainly used for captured USAAF personnel.

== Dulag Luft (Oberursel) Escape ==
As with all POWs, escape was always in mind. Despite initial appearances, and some accusations of collaboration with the Germans, the permanent staff, headed by Day, had set up an escape committee with other members of the staff, including Squadron Leader Roger Bushell and Lt Cmdr Jimmy Buckley RN. Buckley was a pilot in the Fleet Air Arm and as such the Germans had placed him, with all other FAA aircrew, under the responsibility of the Luftwaffe. Bushell was later murdered by the Gestapo following The Great Escape from Stalag Luft III in March 1944.

Several tunnels were started, but the first two ran into flooding problems. However, they were not discovered. The third tunnel ran west from the western barrack block under a sentry tower on the south-western corner of the camp. This was completed in the spring of 1941, and was used by 17 British officers (mainly RAF) in June 1941. The exact date of the escape is not known, but many sources quote it as occurring during the Whitsun weekend.

The escapers, including Day, Buckley, Johnnie Dodge and future Carry On film star Peter Butterworth, were all recaptured within a week. Roger Bushell is believed not to have used the tunnel, instead escaping on the same night from a goat shed in the camp grounds. It is understood that he wished for a slightly earlier start to catch a train for his intended escape route. He was also recaptured.

This was the first mass escape of the war by British officers, and the first tunnel constructed by RAF POWs to be completed and used. All the recaptured escapers were well treated, and after serving their solitary confinement as punishment for the attempt were all transferred to Stalag Luft I. It is reputed that the German Camp Commandant Major Rumpel gave the escapers a case of champagne with the words "Better luck next time, even if I'm not supposed to say so". After this, no further actual escapes took place from this camp, though others were planned, including one by Wing Commander Douglas Bader, the legless fighter ace, during his brief stay at the camp.

== Post-war trial ==
After the war, a British military court tried five Luftwaffe officers at the camp for physically abusing Allied prisoners of war. The defendants were Erich Killinger, Heinz Junge, Otto Boehringer, Heinrich Eberhardt, and Gustav Bauer-Schlichtegroll. Killinger, Junge, and Eberhardt, were found guilty, while the other two defendants were acquitted. Killinger and Junge were each sentenced to five years in prison, while Eberhardt was sentenced to three years in prison. Eberhardt was released from prison in 1947, while Killinger and Junge were released in 1948.
