= Prisoner of War (disambiguation) =

A prisoner of war is a person, whether combatant or non-combatant, who is held in custody by an enemy power during or immediately after an armed conflict.

Prisoner of War may also refer to:

- Prisoner of War (1954 film), an American war–drama film
- Prisoner of War (2025 film), an American-Filipino action thriller war film
- Prisoners of War (TV series) or Hatufim, a 2010 Israeli TV series
- "Prisoner of War" (Falling Skies), a 2011 episode of Falling Skies
- Prisoner of War (video game), a 2002 video game
- Prisoners of War (Homeland), the series finale of the American TV series Homeland
- P.O.W.: Prisoners of War, a 1988 arcade game that was ported to the NES console
- Prisoners of War (album), an album by Sun Rise Above

== See also ==
- Merry Christmas, Mr. Lawrence or Furyo (prisoner of war), a 1983 British-Japanese film
- POW (disambiguation)
