= Wow =

Wow, WoW, or WOW may refer to:

== Games and toys ==
- World of Warcraft, a massively multiplayer online role-playing game (MMORPG)
- World of Warplanes, an online flight simulator
- World of Warships, an online naval simulator (also abbreviated as WoWS)
- Wizard of Wor, a 1981 arcade game by Midway
- Sega Wow, a video game company
- Worlds of Wonder (toy company), a 1980s American toy company

== Music ==
- Wow (band), a Dutch 1990s girl group
- Way Out West, English electronic music duo
- WOW Music, a Hong Kong record label
- SRS Wow, and SRS Wow HD, an audio enhancement suite of Sound Retrieval System technologies
- Wow, a member of the animated girl group VBirds

=== Albums ===
- WOW series, a series of compilation albums of contemporary Christian music
- Wow! (Bananarama album), 1987
- Wow (Bibi Zhou album), 2007
- Wow! (Bill Doggett album), 1965
- WOW (Junko Onishi album), 1993
- Wow (Kate NV album), 2023
- WOW (Mouse on Mars album), a 2012 mini album by Mouse on Mars
- Wow (Superbus album), 2006
- Wow (Verdena album), 2011
- WOW (Wendy O. Williams album), a 1984 album by Wendy O. Williams
- Wow/Grape Jam, a 1968 album by Moby Grape

=== Songs ===
- "Wow" (Kate Bush song), 1979
- "Wow" (Kylie Minogue song), 2008
- "Wow" (Ruslana song), 2011
- "Wow" (Inna song), 2012
- "Wow" (Beck song), 2016
- "Wow" (Marilyn Manson song), 2009
- "Wow" (Post Malone song), 2018
- "Wow" (Zara Larsson song), 2020
- Wow (Zola song), 2020
- "Wow", a 2003 song by Snow Patrol from Final Straw
- "Wow", a 2017 song by Twice from Twicetagram
- "Wow", a 2024 song by Ive from Ive Switch

== Organizations and companies ==
- War on Want, a British anti-poverty charity
- Warbirds Over Wanaka, a biennial international airshow held in New Zealand
- Wide Open West, an American ISP, internet, cable, and phone company
- Wider Opportunities for Women, U.S. non-profit
- Women of the Wall, a Jewish women's organization in Israel
- Women of the World Festival, a festival based in London with global satellite venues
- Women of Wrestling, an American women's wrestling promotion
- Women on Waves, a Dutch pro-choice non-profit organization
- Women on Web, a Canadian pro-choice non-profit organization
- Woodmen of the World, a fraternal organization in Omaha, Nebraska, United States
- Woolworths Group, an Australian retail conglomerate, by Australian Stock Exchange code
- World of Wearable Art, a museum and award show in New Zealand
- World of Wonder (company), an American production company
- World Organization of Workers, an international trade union federation
- WOW! (online service), a defunct ISP from CompuServe
- WOW Promotions, an American mixed martial arts organization
- WOW Sight & Sound, an Australian electronics and music retailer

== People ==
- Caro Wow (born 1999), an Italian singer-songwriter
- Willy on Wheels, sometimes abbreviated as "WoW", a Wikipedia vandal who moved thousands of pages so that their title ended with "on wheels"

== Places ==
- Wall of Wind, a wind engineering testing facility in Florida, United States
- WOW counties, Waukesha, Ozaukee, and Washington counties of Wisconsin, United States
- Wau, South Sudan (or Wow), a town in South Sudan

== Television, radio, and films ==
- World of Winx (also titled Winx Club WOW), a spin-off of Winx Club
- WOW (channel), an Indian television channel in Mumbai
- WOW (TV station), the local WIN Television station broadcasting to remote Western Australia
- WOW (AM), a radio station in Omaha, Nebraska
- WOWT, formerly known as WOW-TV, a TV station in Omaha, Nebraska
- WOW: The CatholicTV Challenge, a television game show
- WOW! (TV series), a 1996 UK CITV programme
- Wow (film), a 1970 Québécois movie directed by Claude Jutra
- wow (Barry), a 2023 TV episode

== Transportation ==
- WOW air, an Icelandic low-cost airline
- WOW Alliance, a global air-cargo alliance
- Air Southwest, an airline based in the Southwest England (ICAO airline code: WOW)
- Woolwich railway station, London, England (National Rail code: WOW)

== Other uses ==
- Way of working, or ways of working, a concept for software development in disciplined agile delivery within the project management framework Disciplined Agile Toolkit
- Lay's WOW chips, a brand of fat-free potato chips
- Wendy O. Williams (1949–1998), an American singer
- Windows on Windows, an application compatibility layer in 32-bit Microsoft Windows
  - WoW64, an application compatibility layer in 64-bit Microsoft Windows
- Wow! (comic), a British comic from 1982–1983
- Wow (recording), a pitch variation while playing a sound recording
- WOW Film Festival (disambiguation), several film festivals
- Wow! signal, a strong radio signal of unknown origin detected by a SETI project in 1977
- Whip em Out Wednesday, a radio promo on the Opie & Anthony Show
- White on White, a form of blotter for means of transporting and taking psychedelic compounds
- Wawonii language (ISO 639-3 code: wow)

== See also ==
- Pow wow (disambiguation)
