= Pow wow (disambiguation) =

A pow wow is a gathering of Native Americans.

Pow wow may also refer to:

== Events ==
- POW! WOW!, an international mural arts festival

== Fiction ==
- Adventures of Pow Wow, an animated cartoon
  - Powwow the Indian Boy, a fictional character from the Adventures of Pow Wow
- Pow Wow Smith, a DC Comics fictional character

== Music ==
- Pow woW, a French music group
- Pepper's Pow Wow (album) 1971 album by Jim Pepper
- "Pow Wow", a song by music group Psycho Realm

== Places ==
- Powwow River, a river that runs through New Hampshire and northern Massachusetts, USA
- Powwow Pond, a pond in Rockingham County, New Hampshire, USA
- Pow-Wow Oak Tree, an oak tree in Belvidere, Lowell, Massachusetts, USA

== Other uses ==
- Pow-wow, a.k.a. Braucherei, a North American vernacular folk magic and healing system rooted in Pennsylvania Dutch folk culture
- Powwow (var. pawwaw), a priest, conjurer, and traditional healer among the Massachusett and Narragansett in the 1600s.
- PowWow, a wireless sensor network (WSN) mote
- PowWow (chat program), an early instant messaging client
- POW WOW, a prisoner-of-war underground newspaper circulated in Germany during World War II
- Powwow Water, a brand of spring water produced exclusively for water coolers

== See also ==
- Powwow-step or electric powwow, a genre of electronica
- POW (disambiguation)
- Wow (disambiguation)
