= Winds of War =

Winds of War may refer to:

- The Winds of War, a novel by Herman Wouk (1971)
- The Winds of War (miniseries) (1983), based on the book by Herman Wouk
- Winds of War (album), a speed metal album by Iron Angel
- Heroes of Might and Magic IV: Winds of War, a 2003 computer video game
- "Winds of War" (Mobile Suit Gundam), an episode of Mobile Suit Gundam
- "The Winds of War", a song on the album The Psycho-Social, Chemical, Biological & Electro-Magnetic Manipulation of Human Consciousness by hip hop group Jedi Mind Tricks

== See also ==
- Wow (disambiguation)
- TWOW (disambiguation)
