= POW (disambiguation) =

POW is "prisoner of war", a person, whether civilian or combatant, who is held in custody by an enemy power during or immediately after an armed conflict.

POW or pow may also refer to:

== Music ==
- "P.O.W" (Bullet for My Valentine song) (2013)
- "Pow", a 1992 song by the Beastie Boys from Check Your Head
- "P.O.W. (Pissed Off White Boy)", a 1993 song by Beowülf from Un-Sentimental
- "Pow", a 1978 song by Graham Central Station from My Radio Sure Sounds Good to Me
- "POW", a 2009 song by Soulja Boy from The DeAndre Way
- Pow (band), a South Korean boy band

== Organizations ==
- POW! Entertainment, a media production company
- Polska Organizacja Wojskowa or Polish Military Organisation
- Protect Our Winters, a non-profit environmental organization
- Portorož Airport's IATA code

== Television ==
- P.O.W. (United States Steel Hour)
- P.O.W. (TV series), a 2003 ITV mini-series
- "P.O.W." (The Flash), an episode of The Flash
- P.O.W. - Bandi Yuddh Ke, Indian political thriller television series

== Other uses ==
- P.O.W.: Prisoners of War, a 1988 arcade game that was ported to the NES console
- Pow (surname)
- pow function in C, the exponentiation function in the programming language C
- Powys, county in Wales, Chapman code POW
- Proof of work or PoW system
- P.O.W; aka Prince of Wales

== See also ==
- Pow! (disambiguation)
- Pow wow (disambiguation)
- Prisoner of War (disambiguation)
