= Colditz Castle =

Renaissance castle in Colditz, Saxony, Germany

- Schloss Colditz
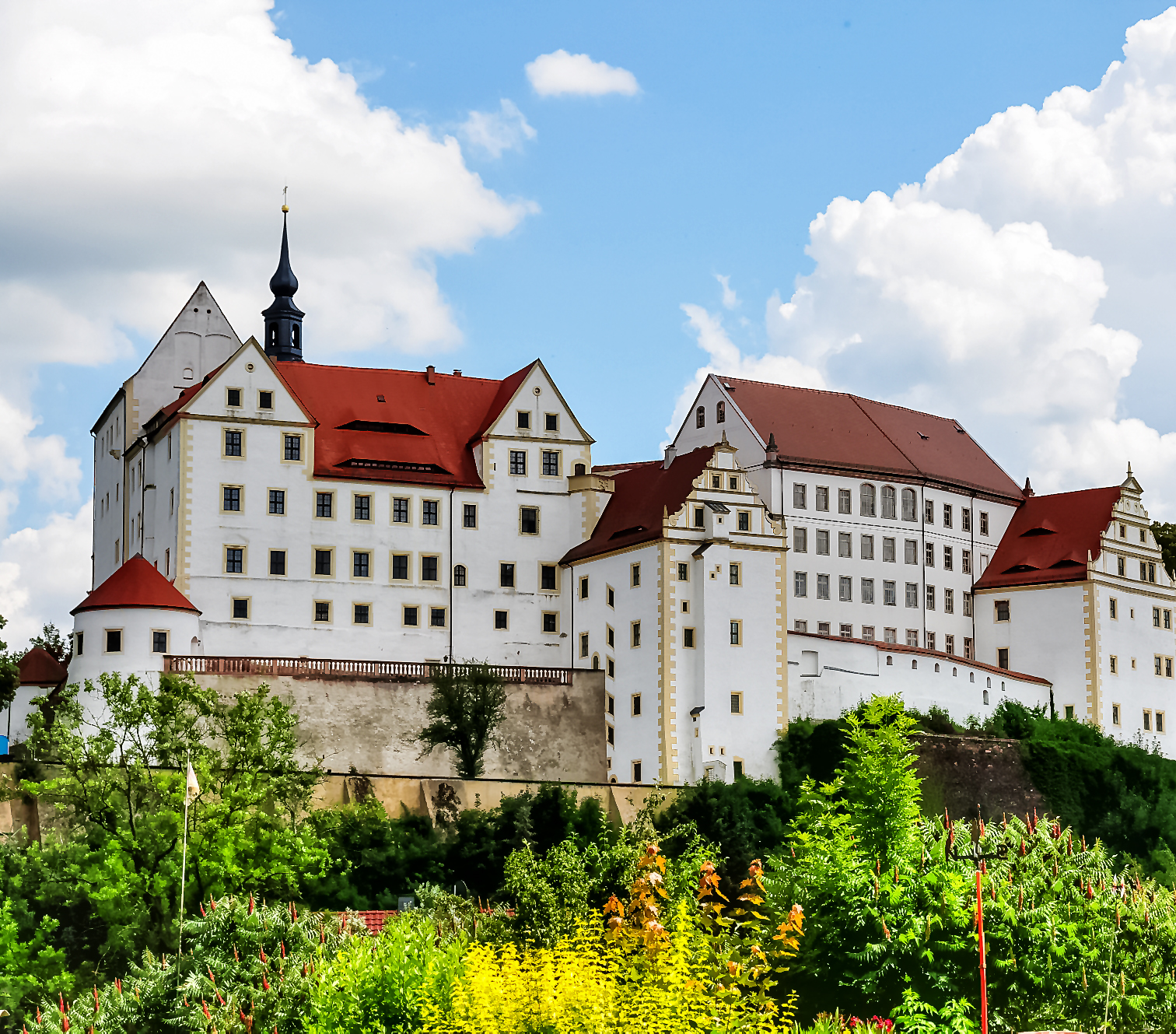
- Castle Colditz in 2011

- Location within Germany

General information
- Architectural style: Renaissance
- Location: Colditz, Germany
- Coordinates: 51.1310°N 12.8074°E
- Client: Augustus of Saxony
- Owner: State Palaces, Castles and Gardens of Saxony

Design and construction
- Architects: Hans Irmisch; Peter Kummer

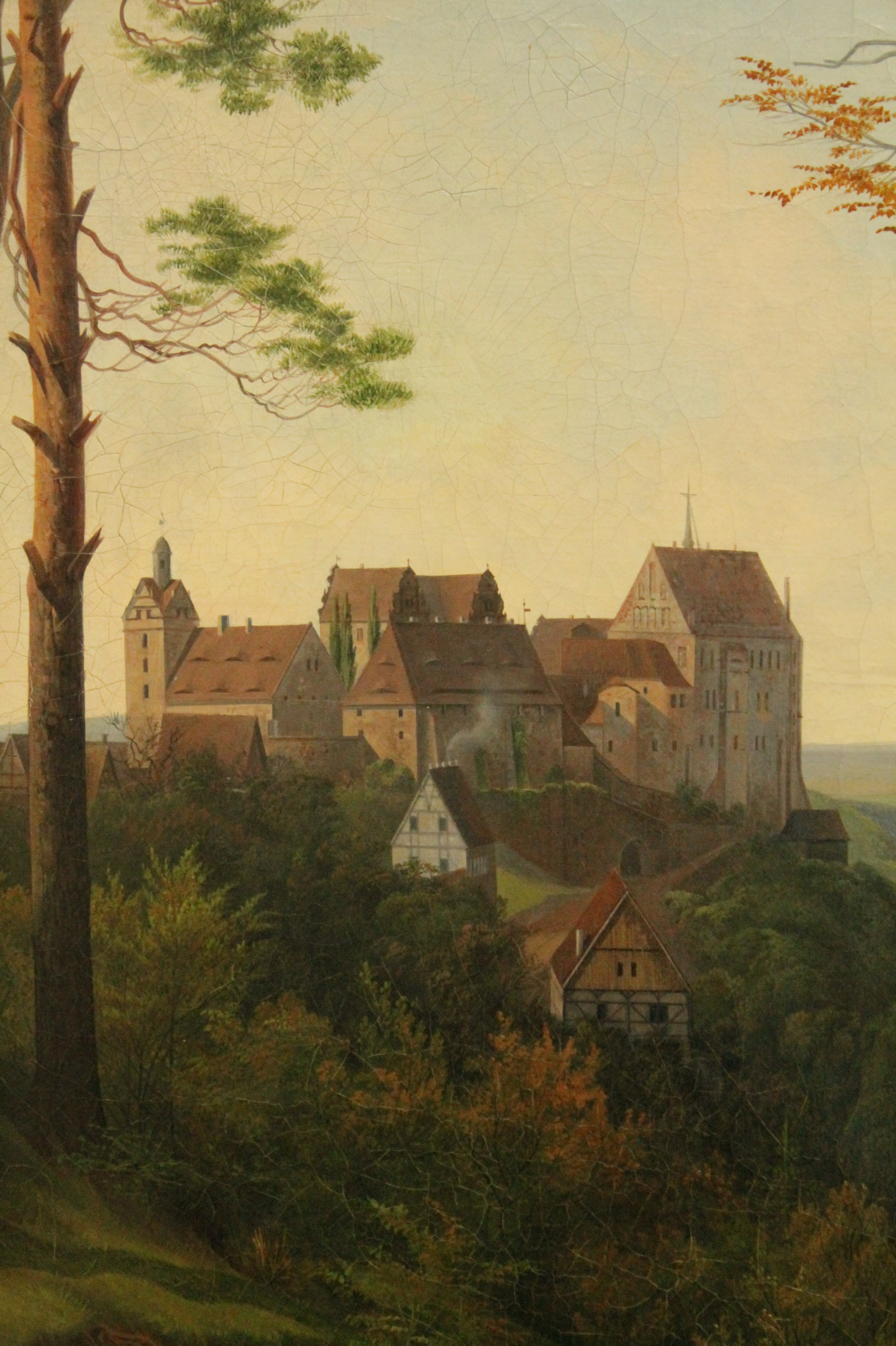
Colditz Castle 1828 by Ernst Ferdinand Oehme, Albertinum, Dresden

Colditz Castle (or Schloss Colditz in German) is a Renaissance castle in the town of Colditz near Leipzig, Dresden and Chemnitz in the state of Saxony in Germany. The castle is between the towns of Hartha and Grimma on a hill spur over the river Zwickauer Mulde, a tributary of the River Elbe. It had the first wildlife park in Germany when, during 1523, the castle park was converted into one of the largest menageries in Europe.

The castle gained international fame as the site of Oflag IV-C, a prisoner-of-war camp during World War II for "incorrigible" Allied officers who had repeatedly attempted to escape from other camps.

== Original castle ==
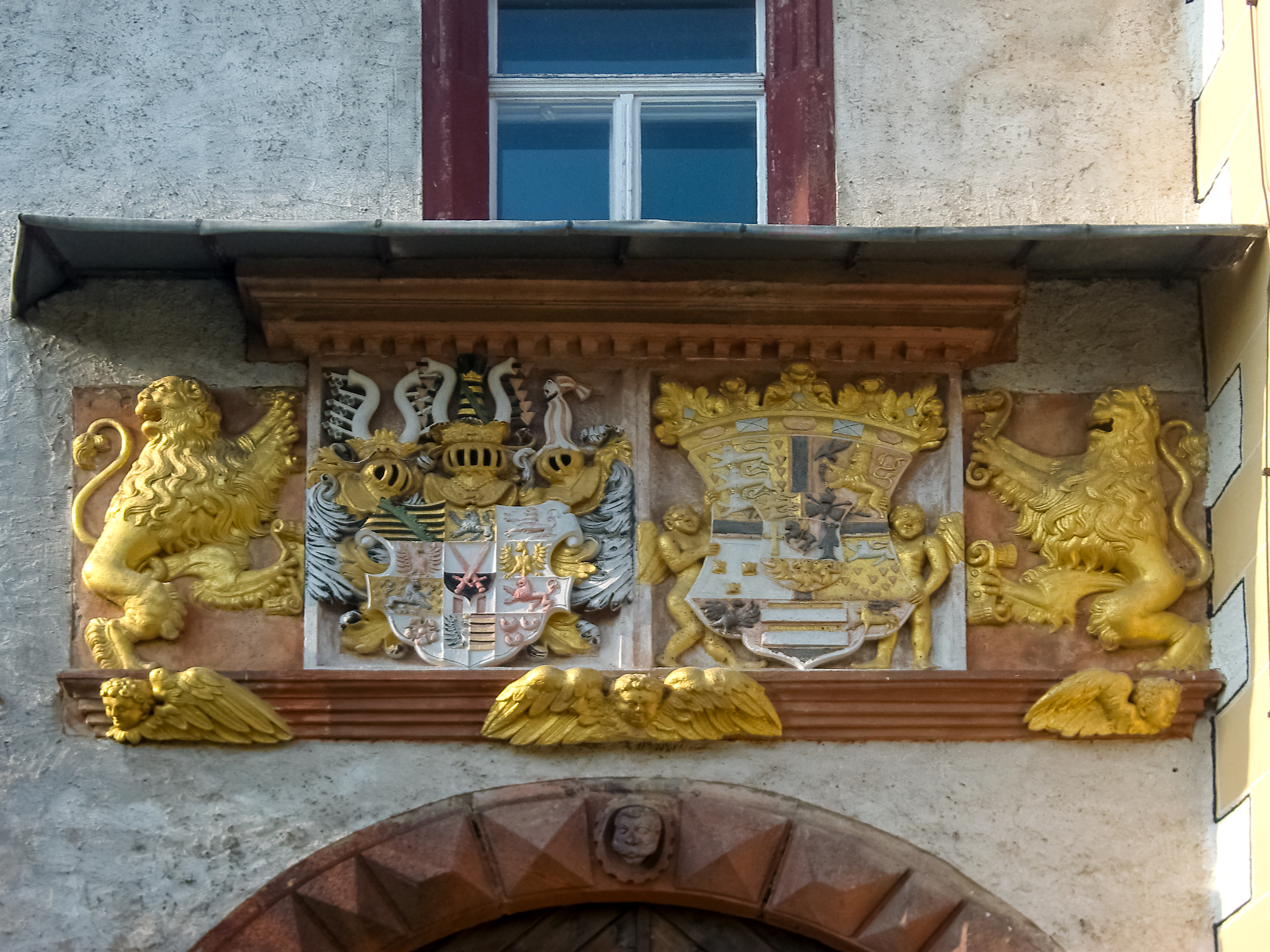
Coat of arms of Augustus of Saxony and his wife Anne of Denmark over the gate to the outer courtyard

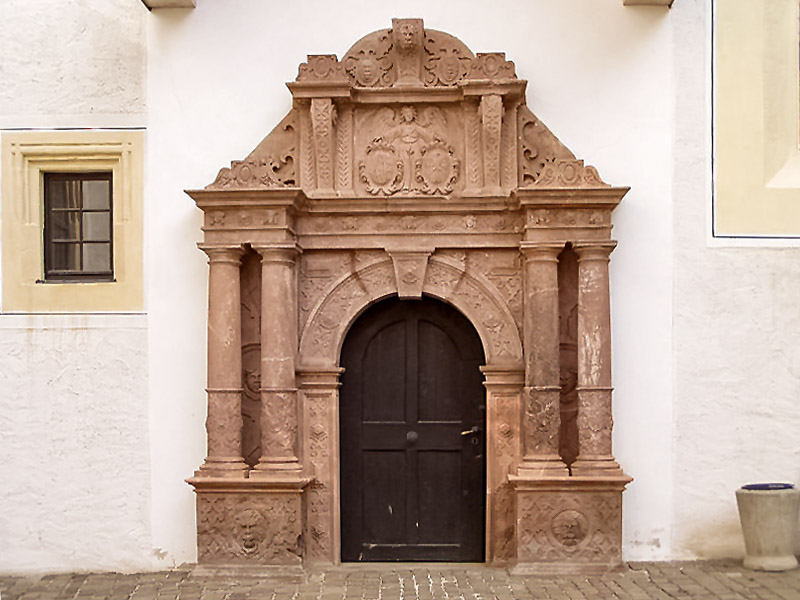
The mannerist portal (rhyolitic tuff) of the church house carved by Andreas Walther II during 1584

In 1046, Henry III of the Holy Roman Empire gave the burghers of Colditz permission to build the first documented settlement at the site. During 1083, Henry IV urged Margrave Wiprecht of Groitzsch to develop the castle site, which Colditz accepted. During 1158, Emperor Frederick Barbarossa made Thimo I "Lord of Colditz", and major building works began. By 1200, the town around the market was established. Forests, empty meadows, and farmland were settled next to the pre-existing Slavic villages Zschetzsch, Zschadraß, Zollwitz, Terpitzsch and Koltzschen. Around that time the larger villages Hohnbach, Thierbaum, Ebersbach and Tautenhain also developed.

During the Middle Ages, the castle was used as a lookout post for the German Emperors and was the hub of the Reich territories of the Pleissenland (anti-Meißen Pleiße-lands). During 1404, the nearly 250-year rule of the dynasty of the Lords of Colditz ended when Thimo VIII sold Colditz Castle for 15,000 silver marks to the Wettin ruler of the period in Saxony.

As a result of family dynastic politics, the town of Colditz was incorporated into the Margraviate of Meissen. During 1430, the Hussites attacked Colditz and set town and castle on fire. Around 1464, renovation and new building work on the castle were done by order of Prince Ernest, who died in Castle Colditz in 1486. During the reigns of Electors Frederick III the Wise and John the Gentle, Colditz was a royal residence of the electors of Saxony.

== Periods of reconstruction and changes in use ==
During 1504, the servant Clemens the baker accidentally set Colditz afire, and the town hall, church, castle and a large part of the town was burned. During 1506, reconstruction began and new buildings were erected around the rear castle courtyard. During 1523, the castle park was converted into one of the largest zoos in Europe. During 1524, rebuilding of the upper floors of the castle began. The castle was reconstructed in a fashion that corresponded to the way it was divided-— into the cellar, the royal house and the banqueting hall building. There is nothing more to be seen of the original castle, where the present rear of the castle is located, but it is still possible to discern where the original divisions were (the Old or Lower House, the Upper House and the Great House).

The structure of the castle was changed during the long reign of the Elector Augustus of Saxony (1553–86), and the complex was reconstructed into a Renaissance style castle from 1577 to 1591, including the portions that were still in the gothic architectural style. Architects Hans Irmisch and Peter Kummer supervised further restoration and rebuilding. Later, Lucas Cranach the Younger was commissioned as an artist in the castle.

During this period the portal at what is known as the church house was created during 1584, made of Rochlitz Porphyr (rhyolite tuff) and richly decorated in the mannerist style by Andreas Walther II. This dimension stone has been in use in architecture for more than 1,000 years. It was at this time that both the interior and the exterior of "the Holy Trinity" castle chapel that links the cellar and electors' house with one another were redesigned. Soon thereafter the castle became an administrative office for the Office of Colditz and a hunting lodge. During 1694, its then-current owner, King Augustus the Strong of Poland, began to expand it, resulting in a second courtyard and a total of 700 rooms.

During the 19th century, the church space was rebuilt in the neo-classic architectural style, but its condition was allowed to deteriorate. The castle was used by Frederick Augustus III, Elector of Saxony as a workhouse to feed the poor, the ill, and persons who had been arrested. It served this purpose from 1803 to 1829, when its workhouse function was assumed by an institution in Zwickau. During 1829, the castle became a mental hospital for the "incurably insane" from Waldheim. During 1864, a new hospital building was erected in the Gothic Revival style, on the ground where the stables and working quarters had been previously located. It remained a mental institution until 1924.

From 1829 to 1924, Colditz was a sanatorium, generally reserved for the wealthy and the nobility of Germany. The castle thus functioned as a hospital during a long period of massive change in Germany, from slightly after the Napoleonic Wars destroyed the Holy Roman Empire and created the German Confederation, throughout the lifespan of the North German Confederation, the complete reign of the German Empire, throughout the First World War, and until the beginnings of the Weimar Republic. Between 1914 and 1918, the castle was home to both psychiatric and tuberculosis patients, 912 of whom died of malnutrition. The castle was home to several notable figures during its time as a mental institution, including Ludwig Schumann, the second youngest son of the composer Robert Schumann, and Ernst Baumgarten, one of the inventors of the airship.

When the Nazis gained power during 1933, they converted the castle into a political prison for communists, homosexuals, Jews and other people they considered undesirable. Starting 1939, Allied prisoners were housed there.

== Use as POW camp ==
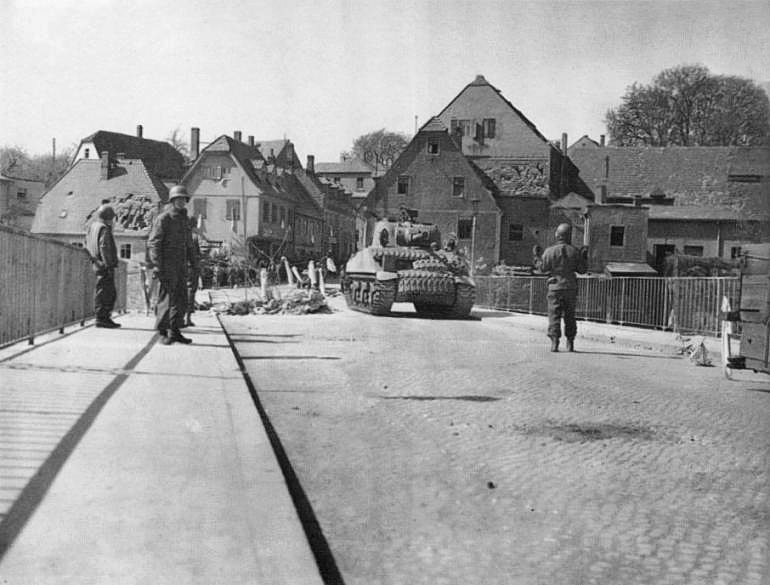
Colditz Bridge in 1945 after the town had been occupied by the U.S. Army

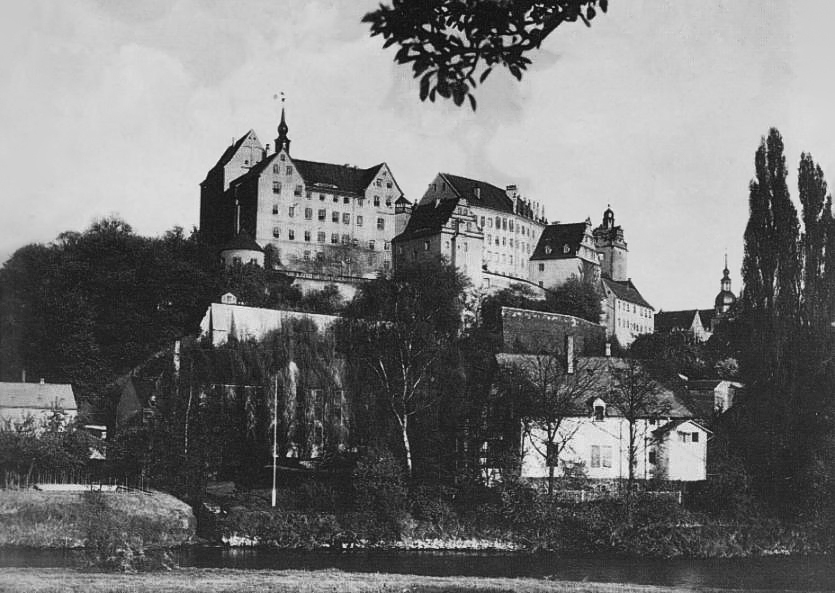
Colditz Castle in April 1945; photo taken by a U.S. Army soldier

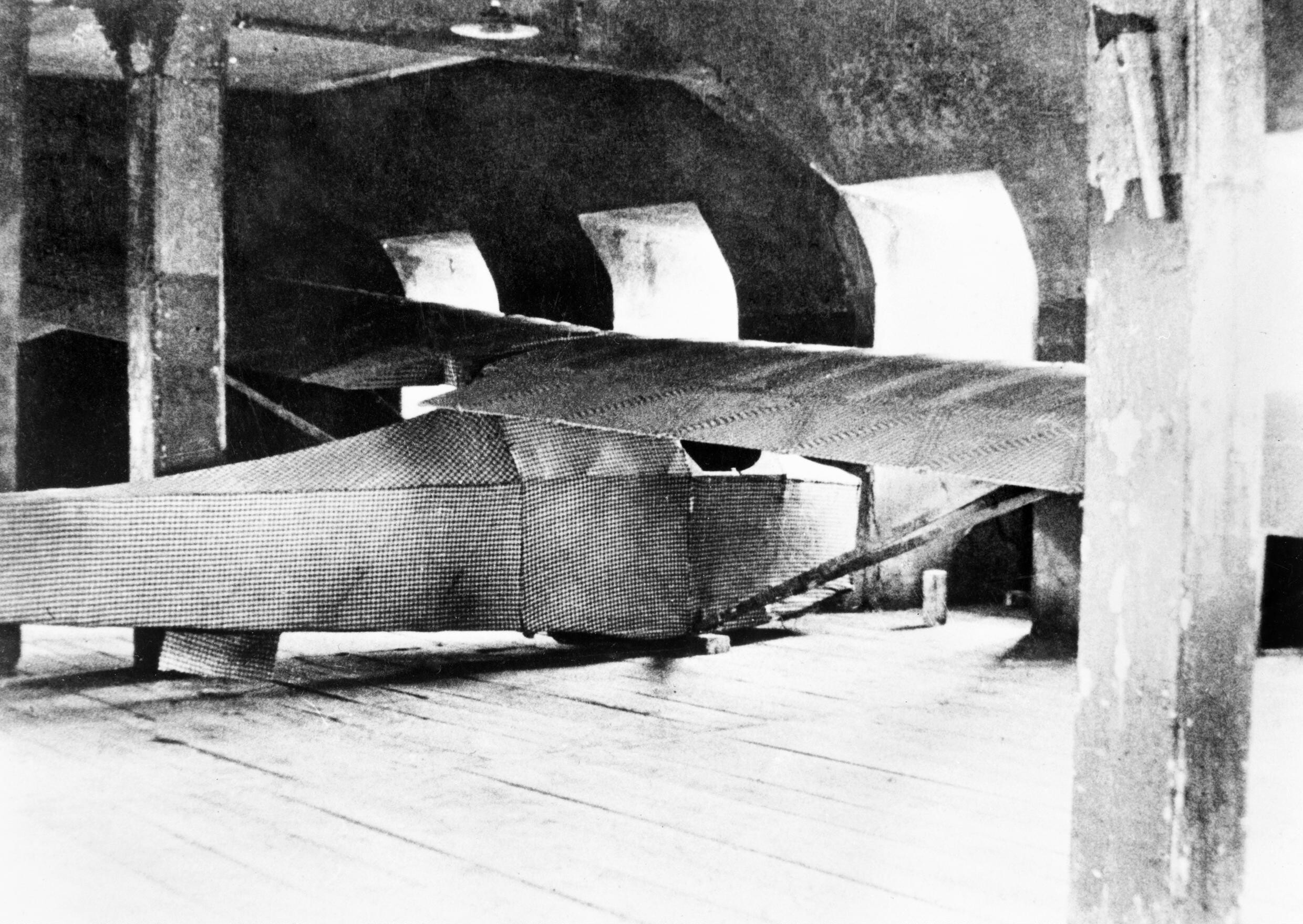
The only photograph of the original Colditz Cock glider taken on 15 April 1945 by Lee Carson, American war correspondent assigned to the task force which liberated the castle

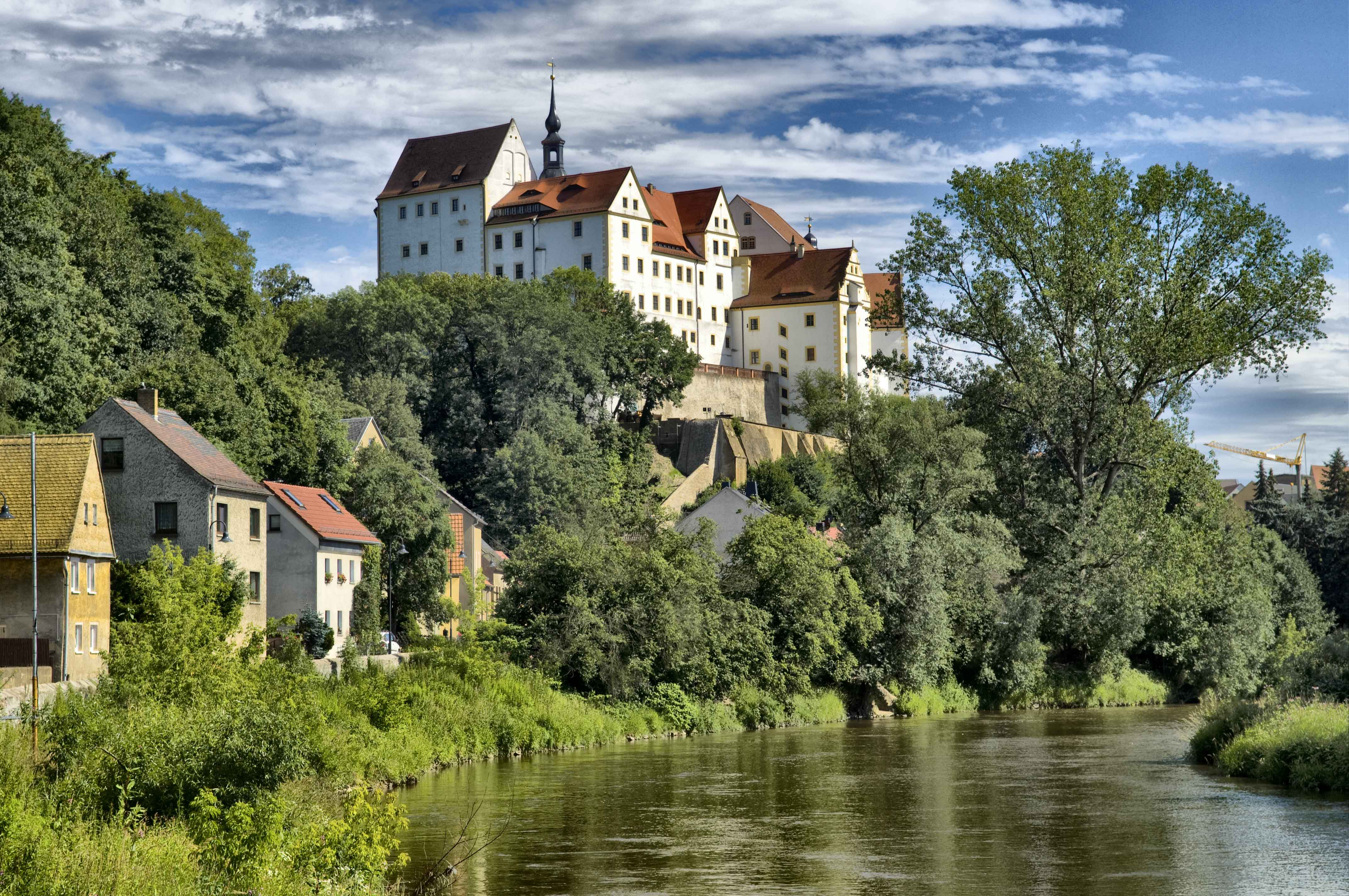
Colditz Castle in 2011

After the outbreak of World War II, the castle was converted into a high security prisoner-of-war camp for officers who had become security or escape risks or who were regarded as particularly dangerous. Since the castle is situated on a rocky outcrop above the River Zwickauer Mulde, the Germans believed it to be an ideal site for a high security prison.

The larger outer court in front of the Kommandantur (commander's offices) had only two exits and housed a large German garrison. The prisoners lived in an adjacent courtyard in a 90 ft (27 m) tall building. Outside, the flat terraces which surrounded the prisoners' accommodation were watched constantly by armed sentries and surrounded by barbed wire. The prison was named Oflag IV-C (officer prison camp 4C) and was operated by the Wehrmacht.

While the camp was home to prisoners of war from many different countries, including Poland, France, Belgium, the Netherlands, and Canada, in May 1943 Wehrmacht High Command decided to house only British and American officers.

The camp's first British prisoners were the Laufen Six on 7 November 1940, who were transferred to Colditz after their first escape attempt from the Laufen Camp.

Although it was considered a high security prison, it had one of the greatest records of successful escape attempts. This could be owing to the general nature of the prisoners that were sent there; most of them had attempted escape previously from other prisons and were transferred to Colditz because the Germans had thought the castle escape-proof.

One escape scheme even included a glider, the Colditz Cock, that was built and kept in a remote portion of the castle's attic during the winter of 1944–45. The glider was never used, as the camp was liberated not long after its completion. After liberation, the glider was brought down from the hidden workshop to the attic below and assembled for the prisoners to see. Assigned to the task force that liberated the castle, American war correspondent Lee Carson entered Colditz on 15 April 1945 and took the only photograph of the glider completed in the attic. For some time after the war the glider was regarded as a tall tale, as there was no solid proof that the glider had existed and Colditz was then in the Soviet occupation zone in Germany. Bill Goldfinch took home the drawings he had made while designing the glider, and when the single photograph finally surfaced the story was taken seriously.

During 1999, a full-sized replica of the glider was commissioned by Channel 4 Television in the UK and built by Southdown Aviation Ltd at Lasham Airfield, closely following Goldfinch's drawings. Watched by several of the former prisoners of war who worked on the original, it was test-flown at RAF Odiham during 2000. The escape plan could have worked. In 2012, Channel 4 commissioned another full-sized replica of the glider which was launched from the same roof as had been planned for the original. The unmanned radio-controlled replica made it across the river and landed in a meadow 180 metres below.

Captain Pat Reid, who successfully escaped from Colditz in 1942, went on to write multiple works on the living conditions and various escape attempts at Colditz from 1940 to 1945: The Colditz Story and The Latter Days at Colditz. In the early 1970s, he served as a technical consultant for a BBC television series, Colditz (1972), featuring David McCallum, Edward Hardwicke and Robert Wagner, that focused on life at Colditz.

The escapes from Colditz, featured in many works of fiction or documentaries, popularized the unrealistic image of prisoner of war escapes as being common; this is sometimes referred to as the "Colditz Myth".

During the last days of the prison camp at Colditz, many of its prominent or high-ranking prisoners were transferred to Laufen by order of Himmler. In April 1945, U.S. troops entered the town of Colditz and, after a two-day fight, captured the castle on 16 April 1945. In May 1945, the Soviet occupation of Colditz began. According to the agreement at the Yalta Conference it became a part of East Germany. The government turned Colditz Castle into a prison for local criminals. Later, the castle was a home for the aged and a nursing home, as well as a hospital and psychiatric clinic. For many years after the war, forgotten hiding places and tunnels were found by repairmen, including a radio room established by the French POWs, which was then "lost" again to be rediscovered some twenty years later.

=== Notable occupants ===
- (United Kingdom) Gp Capt Douglas Bader, RAF flying ace, amputee of both lower legs and subject of the documentary book and film Reach for the Sky
- (Free France) Gen Georges Bergé, co-founder of the Special Air Service
- (Poland) Gen Tadeusz Bór-Komorowski, Head of Polish Underground Army
- (Czech Republic) Flt Lt Josef Bryks, Czech pilot, participant of the Great Escape, before which tried to escape three times.
- (United Kingdom) Capt Micky Burn, No. 2 Commando, journalist and writer
- Gen Jean Flavigny, Notable Tank Commander from the Battle of France
- (United Kingdom) Lt Charles Hope, 51st (Highland) Division, 3rd Marquess of Linlithgow
- (United Kingdom) 2Lt Desmond Llewelyn, Royal Welch Fusiliers, later known as the actor playing Q in 17 James Bond films
- (United Kingdom) Capt Kenneth Lockwood, Royal West Surrey Regiment, one of the Laufen Six then part of the escape team at Colditz
- (United Kingdom) Lt Airey Neave, Royal Artillery, later Lt Col and Conservative MP
- (United Kingdom) Capt Pat Reid, Royal Army Service Corps, one of the Laufen Six then British escape officer at Colditz, before writing about his experiences
- (United States) Col William Schaefer, U.S. Army
- (United Kingdom) Lt Col David Stirling, founder of the Special Air Service
- (United Kingdom) Flight Lieutenant Lorne Welch, sent to Colditz after escaping from a POW camp, dressed in German uniform, and re-captured when trying to start a German aircraft to fly to Sweden
- (New Zealand) Capt Charles Upham VC and bar, 20th Battalion, the only fighting soldier to be awarded the Victoria Cross twice

== Present ==
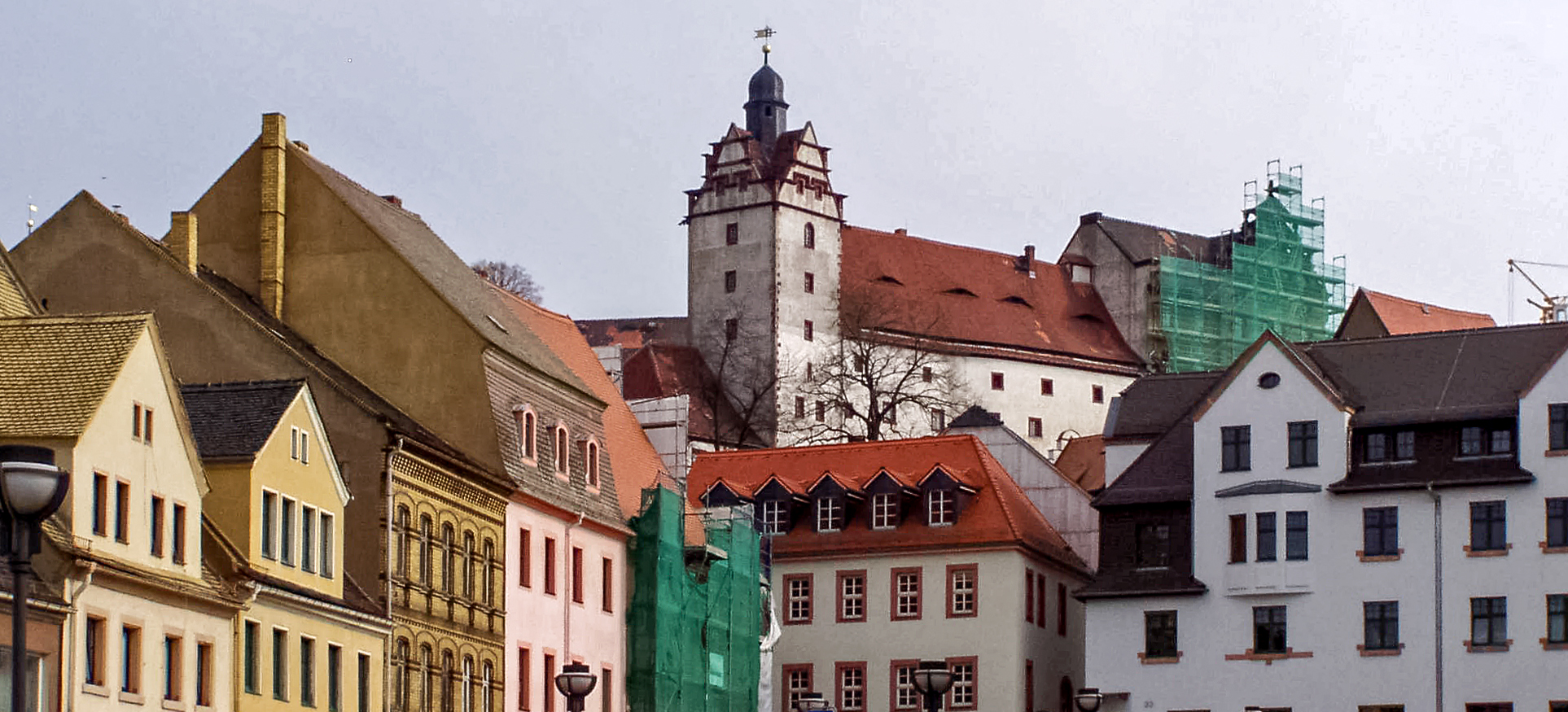
During 2005, the scaffolding was visible from town.

During 2006 and 2007, the castle underwent a significant amount of refurbishment and restoration which was paid for by the state of Saxony. The castle walls were repainted to recreate the appearance of the castle prior to World War II.

With renovations largely completed, the castle now includes both a museum and guided tours showing some of the escape tunnels built by prisoners of the Oflag during the war. The chapel has been restored to its prewar decoration, with glass panels inserted to the flag stone flooring to reveal an escape tunnel dug by French escapees.

The outer courtyard and former German Kommandantur (guard quarters) have been converted into a youth hostel / hotel and the Gesellschaft Schloss Colditz e.V. (the Colditz Castle historical society), founded during 1996, has its offices in a portion of the administration building in the front castle court.
