= Pow! =

Pow! may refer to:

- Pow!, an onomatopoeia for a sudden, hard blow, first used in action comics
- Pow! (album), 1967 album by Sonny Stitt
- Pow! (comics), a 1960s British comic
- POW! Entertainment, an American media production company
- Pow! (novel), a 2012 novel by Mo Yan
- "Pow! (Forward)", the 2004 debut single by English grime music artist Lethal Bizzle

== See also ==
- POW (disambiguation)
