= Colditz Cock =

Glider built by British prisoners of war

Coordinates: 51°07′53″N 12°48′26″E

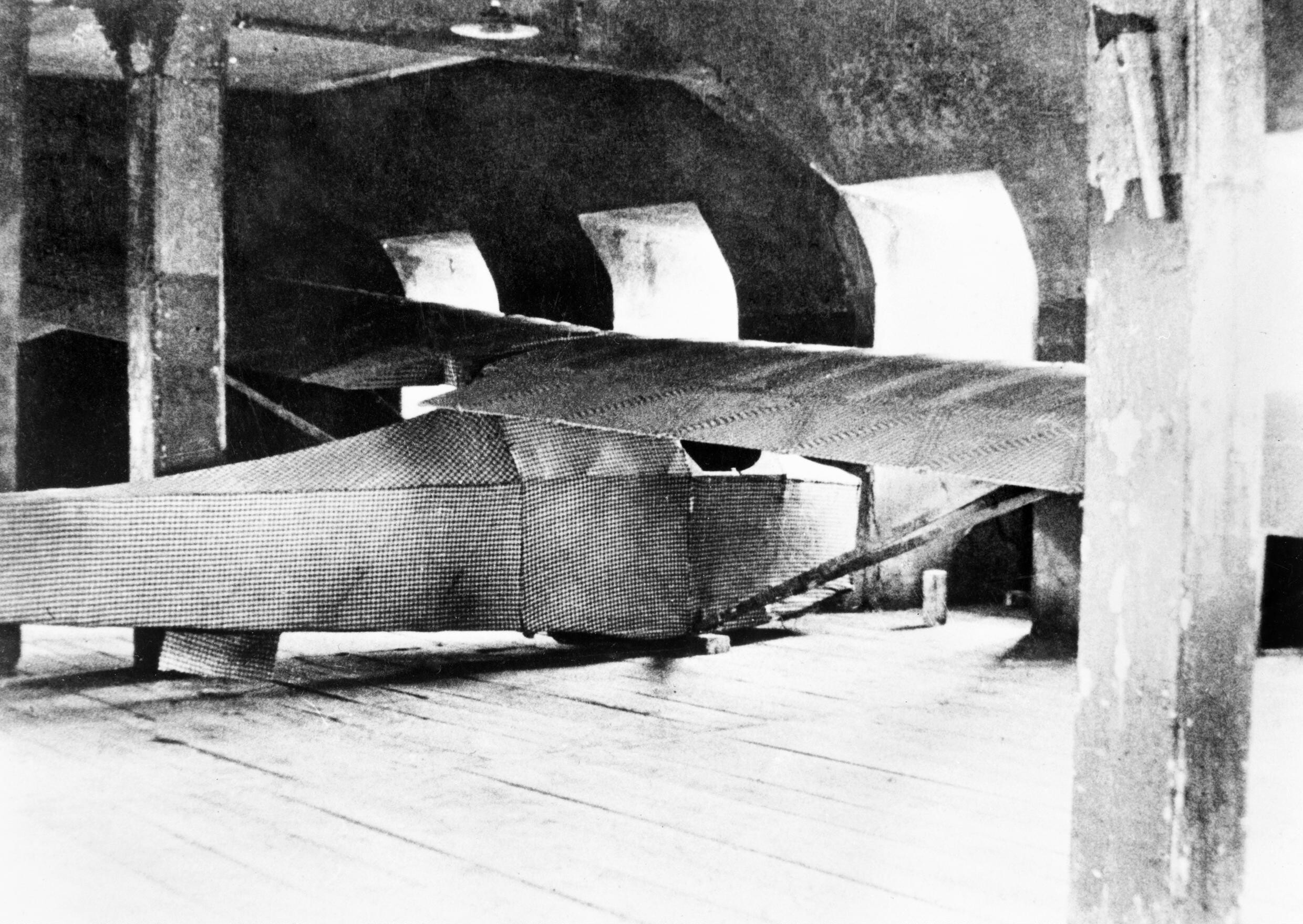
- The only known photograph of the original "Cock" glider taken on 15 April 1945 by Lee Carson, one of two American newspaper correspondents assigned to the task force which captured the castle.

General information
- Type: Glider for prison escape
- Manufacturer: Inmates of Oflag IV-C
- Designer: Bill Goldfinch, Jack Best
- Primary user: Allied PoWs
- Number built: 1

History
- First flight: Never flew
- Retired: 1945

The Colditz Cock was a glider built by British prisoners of war during World War II for an escape attempt from Oflag IV-C (Colditz Castle) prison camp in Germany.

== Background ==
After the execution of 50 prisoners who had taken part in the "Great Escape" from Stalag Luft III, the Allied High Command had discouraged escape attempts, though the plan to build a glider was encouraged in order to divert the energies of the prisoners from descending into boredom and tedium.

The idea for the glider came from Lieutenant Tony Rolt. Rolt, who was not an airman, had noticed the chapel roof line was completely obscured from the German guards' view. He realised that the roof would make a perfect launching point from which the glider could fly across the River Mulde, which was about 60 metres below.

== Construction ==
The team was headed by Bill Goldfinch and Jack Best. Goldfinch and Best were aided by their discovery in the prison library of Aircraft Design, a two-volume work by C.H. Latimer-Needham which explained the necessary physics and engineering and included a detailed diagram of a wing section. The glider was assembled by Goldfinch and Best and 12 assistants known as "apostles", in the lower attic above the chapel. Future RAF Air commodore Geoffrey D. Stephenson assisted in the project. The 20-metre-long (60 ft) runway was to be constructed from tables and the glider was to be launched using a pulley system based on a falling metal bathtub full of concrete, using a gravity-assisted acceleration to 50 kilometres per hour (30 mph).

The officers who took part in the project built a false wall to hide the secret space in the attic where they slowly built the glider from stolen pieces of wood. Since the Germans were accustomed to looking down for tunnels, not up for secret workshops, the officers felt quite safe from detection. Nevertheless, they placed many lookouts and created an electric alarm system to warn the builders of approaching guards.

Over thirty ribs had to be constructed (around a third being structural compression ribs), predominantly formed from bed slats, but also from every other piece of wood the POWs could surreptitiously obtain. The wing spars were constructed from floor boards. Control wires were made from electrical wiring in unused portions of the castle. A glider expert, Lorne Welch, was asked to review the stress diagrams and calculations made by Goldfinch.

The glider constructed was a lightweight, two-seater, high wing, monoplane design. It had a Luton Major-style rudder and square elevators. The wingspan, tip to tip, was 10 metres (32 ft), and it was 6 metres (19 ft 9 in) from nose to tail. Prison sleeping bags of blue and white checked cotton were used to skin the glider, and German ration millet was boiled and used as a form of dope to seal the cloth pores. The completed glider weighed 110 kilograms (240 lb).

A list of tools used in constructing the glider

Side-framed saw

- handle of beech bed board
- frame of iron window bars
- blade of gramophone spring with 8 teeth / in (3 mm teeth)

Minute saw for fine work

- gramophone spring blade, 25 teeth / in (1 mm teeth)

5/8 in (16 mm) metal drill obtained by bribery

- drill bits for making holes made from nails

A gauge

- made of beech, with cupboard bolt and gramophone needle

Large plane, 14½ in (368 mm) long

- 2 inch blade obtained by bribing a German guard
- wooden box (four pieces of beech screwed together)

Small plane, 8½ in (216 mm) long

- blade made from a table knife

Plane, 5 in (127 mm) long

Square

- made of beech with gramophone spring blade

Set of keys including:

- universal door pick, forged from a bucket handle

The take-off was scheduled for the spring of 1945 during an air raid blackout but by then the Allied guns could be heard and the war's outcome was fairly certain. The British escape officer decided that the glider should be available for use in case the SS ordered the massacre of the prisoners as a way to get a message out to approaching American troops. The glider was approaching completion when the American Army liberated the prisoners on 16 April 1945. Assigned to the task force that liberated the castle, war correspondent Lee Carson entered Colditz on 15 April 1945 and took the only photograph of the glider completed in the attic.

Although the Colditz Cock never flew in real life, the concept was fictionalised, depicting a successful flight and escape, in the 1971 TV film The Birdmen starring Doug McClure, Chuck Connors, René Auberjonois and Richard Basehart. One episode of the BBC TV series Colditz depicts the decision to build a glider as an escape attempt. It is also depicted in the final escape from Colditz Castle in the fictional story depicted in the 2002 video game Prisoner of War.

The fate of the glider is not known, but the castle was in the zone controlled by the Soviets, who did not co-operate with its reclamation. However, Goldfinch had kept his drawings, which enabled a one-third scale model to be constructed. This was eventually launched from the castle roof in 1993.

A set of plans for the glider are in the collection of the Imperial War Museum.

== Modern replica ==
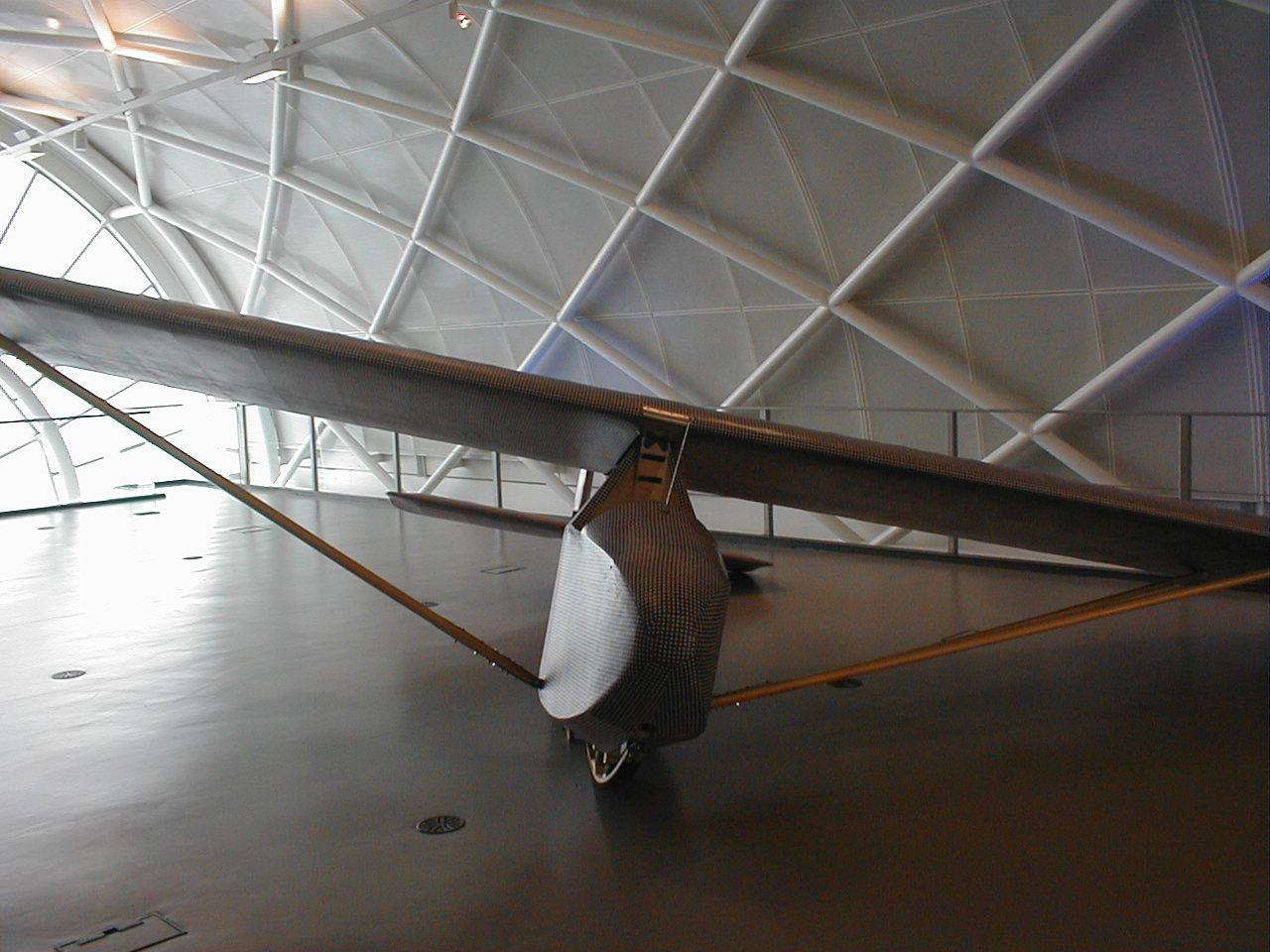
A replica of the Colditz Glider as seen at the Imperial War Museum in London

A flyable expanded polystyrene model of the glider was produced by the model kit manufacturer Airfix in its Skycraft range in the 1970s.

In 1999, a full-sized replica of the Colditz glider was commissioned by Channel 4 and was built by Southdown Aviation Ltd at Lasham Airfield. The glider was test flown successfully in 2000 by John Lee on its first attempt at RAF Odiham with Best, Goldfinch and about a dozen of the veterans who had worked on the original more than 55 years earlier proudly looking on. Jack Best died later that year. The replica is now housed on loan at the Gliding Heritage Centre.

The programme was shown in 2000 by Channel 4 in the UK as part of a 3-part documentary series called "Escape from Colditz". The Channel 4 material was edited to 60 minutes and shown in the US in 2001 as "Nazi Prison Escape" on the Nova television series.

In March 2012, a radio-controlled, full-sized replica glider was built by Tony Hoskins' UK based glider maintenance/repair company South East Aircraft Services in the Chapel attic and was flown from Colditz for a Channel 4 documentary. It was launched (unmanned) from the same roof as had been planned for the original. The radio-controlled replica made it safely across the river and landed in a meadow 180 metres below. The documentary aired in North America on PBS under the title "Escape from Nazi Alcatraz" on 14 May 2014. The glider built for this 2012 documentary now forms part of a new museum display in the Chapel Attic in Colditz castle, and opened to the public on the 70th Anniversary of the Liberation of Colditz in April 2015.

The book Flight from Colditz by Tony Hoskins was published by Pen & Sword in the UK in April 2016. It tells not only the story of the original example built by the prisoners, but also details the other replicas built and on display.

== Specifications ==
Data from British Gliders and Sailplanes

General characteristics

- Crew: 2
- Length: 20 ft 0 in (6.1 m)
- Wingspan: 32 ft 0 in (9.75 m)
- Aspect ratio: 6.4
- Airfoil: Clark Y-H
- Empty weight: 240 lb (108.86 kg)
- Gross weight: 560 lb (254.02 kg)

Performance

- Stall speed: 31 mph (50 km/h, 27 kn)
- Lift-to-drag: 12:1
- Wing loading: 3.45 lb/sq ft (16.84 kg/m^{2})

== See also ==
- Attempts to escape Oflag IV-C
- Wagner DOWA 81, improvised escape aircraft built to escape East Germany
- List of gliders
