= Wagner DOWA 81 =

Aircraft designed by Gerhard Wagner

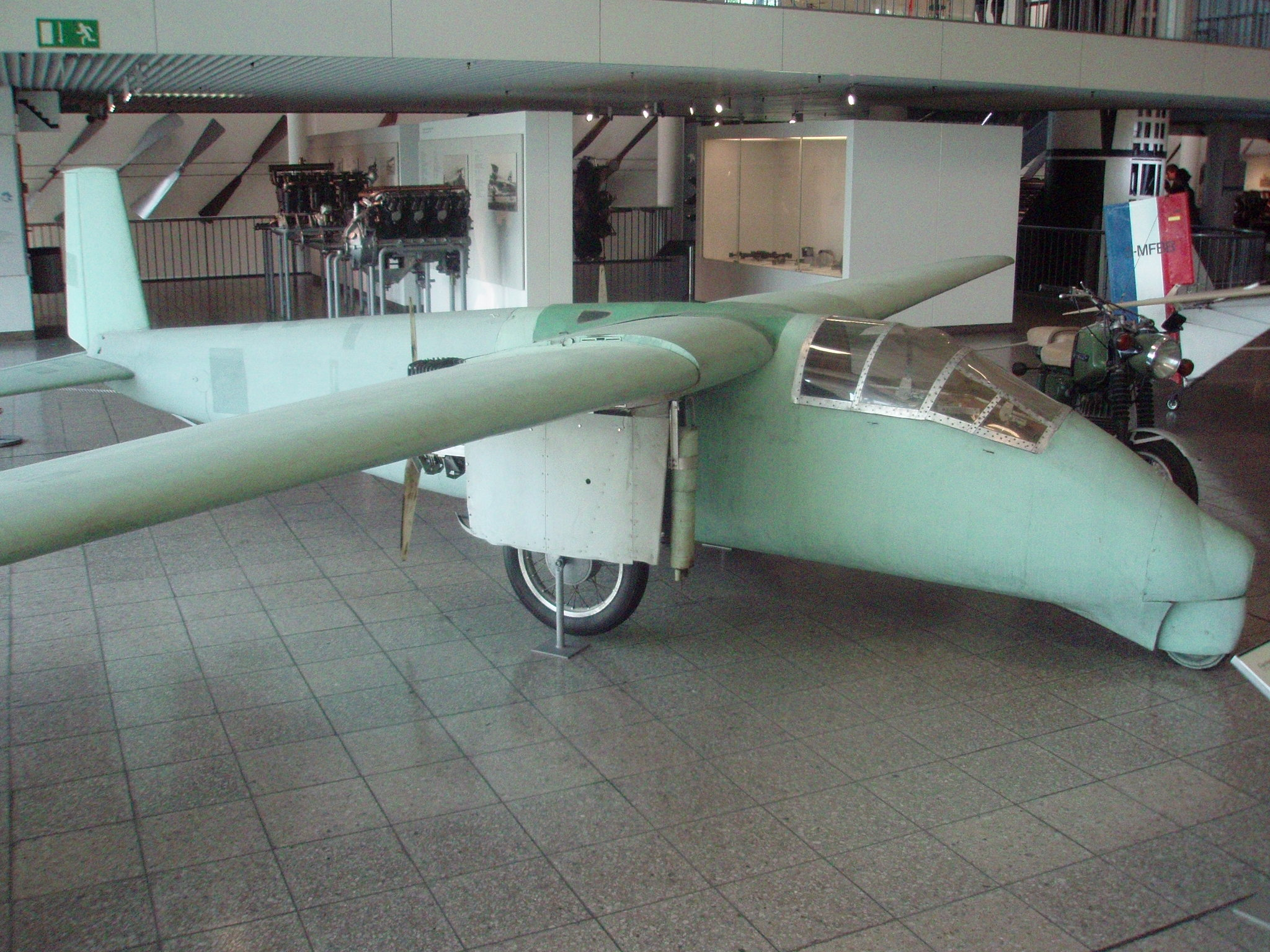

General information
- Type: Homemade airplane
- Manufacturer: Dr Gerhard Wagner
- Designer: Dr Gerhard Wagner
- Status: On static display
- Number built: 1

History
- First flight: Never flew

The Wagner DOWA 81 (also known as the Pfeil 5) was an aircraft designed and built by Dr. Gerhard Wagner in order to escape East Germany. (DOWA being a contraction of “Doctor Wagner” and "81" referring to the year of the intended escape.)

== Background ==
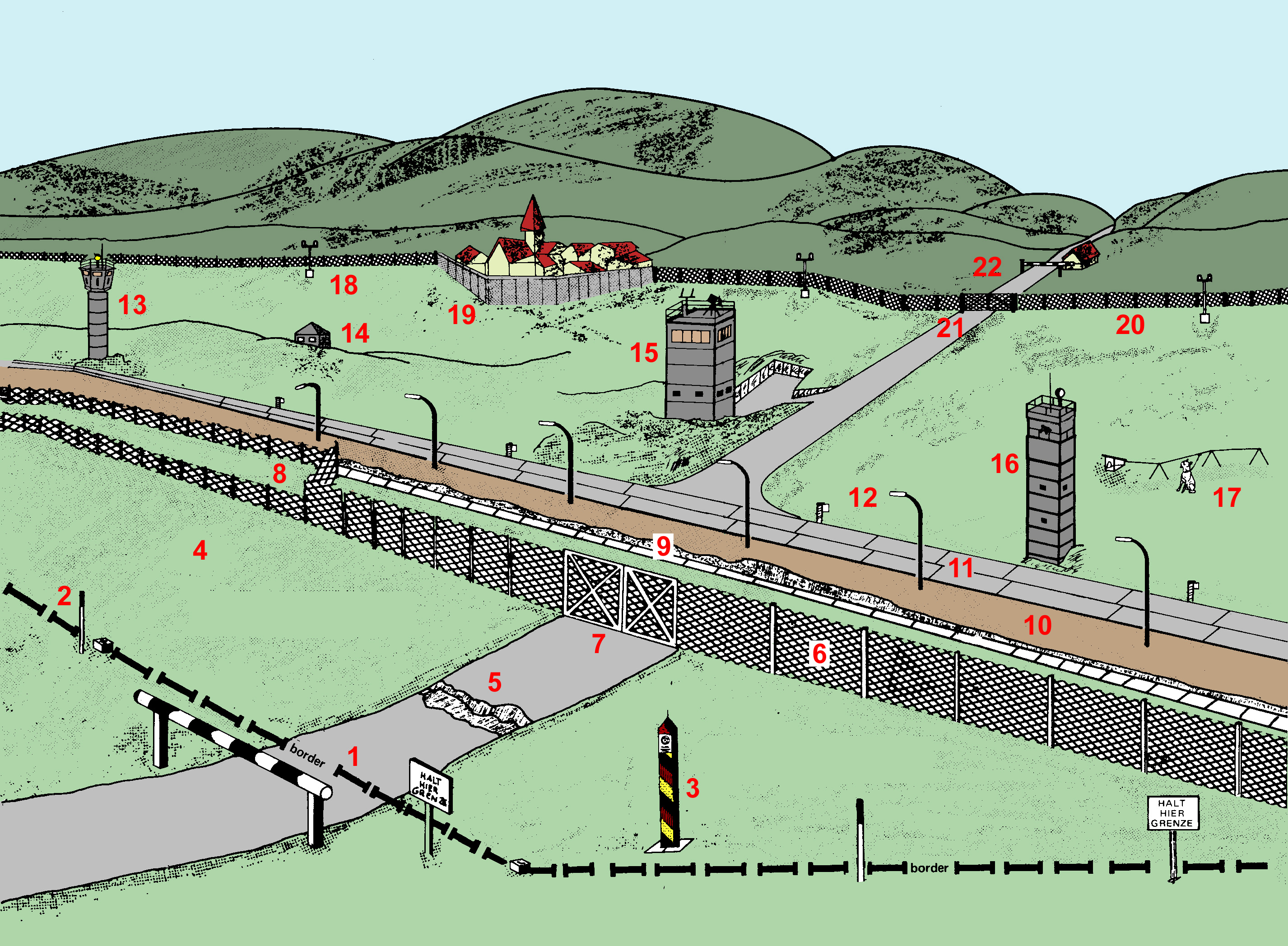
Diagram of East German border fortifications

East Germany, then part of the Eastern Bloc, was separated from West Germany in the Western Bloc by the inner German border and the Berlin Wall, which were heavily fortified with watchtowers, land mines, armed soldiers, and various other measures to prevent illegal crossings. East German border troops were instructed to prevent defection to West Germany by all means, including lethal force (Schießbefehl; "order to fire").

Gerhard Wagner (b. 1939) was a qualified aircraft engineer. While still a student, he had almost fled during construction of the Berlin Wall. However, he later accepted the situation. He married Ingeburg Hallbauer, and had three sons - Udo, Jörg, and Gerd. In 1961, the GDR abolished the aviation industry, leaving Wagner without any demand for his skills. He was also unable to pursue his passion of flying gliders, as the law allowed only those joining the Air Force to fly.

Wagner initially considered building a submarine to escape via the Baltic Sea, but doubted his skill in this area, and so turned to his strength: aircraft design. In order to prevent informants discovering the plan, he partitioned off the back area of his apartment kitchen using cupboards and curtains.

== Design ==
By mid-1979, Wagner had completed the designs for his airplane. He designed it with an enclosed cockpit and contra-rotating twin propellers in pusher configuration powered by two 19 hp engines taken from a pair of motorbikes. The motorbikes also provided the wheels for the undercarriage. He calculated the flight weight to be around 580 kilograms (himself, his wife, and his three sons), which necessitated adding landing flaps for the wings for better control. The aircraft, at just under six metres in length, was also designed to be easily disassembled into four parts, the largest of which did not exceed four metres in length, allowing it to be hidden and transported in a car trailer.

== Construction ==
Wagner built the airplane in secret, using whatever materials he could acquire. Wagner's son Udo, who was seventeen at the time, was a motorbike enthusiast, playing for a Dresden Motoball club, and was able to secure the purchase of two heavily used MZ-ES-250/2 motorbikes for 4,500 Ostmarks. He then overhauled them, dismantled and removed the gearboxes in order to allow the crankshafts to turn the propellers, and reversed the polarity of one of the engines. The engine mufflers were rotated 90° due to the crankshaft being repositioned lengthways.

Several steps were taken to reduce the amount of noise produced by the aircraft. The propellers, designed according to plans from the 1930s, already set to rotate at around 800 kmh, were prevented from going faster than the speed of sound, and the air inlets on the carburetors were also rotated 90°, and hidden in the chassis nacelles with the mufflers. The front wheels of the motorbikes, along with their brakes and suspension, were positioned here too. Air channels were created for cooling the cylinders. Before they attached the motorbike engines, Udo and Jörg mounted one on the car trailer and used a spring balance between the car and the trailer to determine whether the thrust would be enough to power the aircraft.

Although the necessary materials (plywood, balsa wood, aluminium, plexiglass and polyester were in short supply in East Germany, the family was able to procure them from various hobby shops, which they visited in a wide area around Dresden to prevent drawing attention to themselves. Wagner's mother-in-law, who lived in the West, was brought in on the plan and smuggled in glass, silk, bearings, and saw blades for cutting the aluminium sheets. The instruments needed for flight and navigation (altimeter, airspeed indicator and compass) were either built by Wagner, smuggled from the West, or purchased on the black market.

Wagner tested all the various elements of the aircraft in order to ensure it would successfully fly, including stress-testing the wing-fuselage connection with the aid of jacks and springs, showing that it could carry at least 2.4 times the intended weight.

== Discovery ==
Wagner intended to take off from an abandoned coal mine in Nonnewitz near Leipzig, as it was a good distance away from any public roads and buildings. He planned to assemble the aircraft in a nearby warehouse and use the track bed of the mine railway as the runway. At 600 metres long, it would be adequate for the aircraft, which required a runway of at least 450 metres. Following assembly of the aircraft, he would flight-test it before landing. His family would then board, and he would fly south, following the highway (keeping low so as to stay below the radar), and after a journey of around 90 kilometres (an estimated half hour flight), land in a field near Hof, West Germany.

Unknown to Wagner, the Stasi was spying on him. They carried out extensive checks and created a file about him, in addition to secretly searching and bugging his apartment and checking his mail. At least four unofficial Stasi employees were also assigned to him.

On July 25, 1981 at 7:00 AM, the day before the intended escape, the Stasi arrested Wagner and his family at their apartment. The family was sentenced to a total of twelve years in prison for preparing to cross the border illegally. Wagner was sent to Brandenburg Prison, his wife to Hoheneck Women's Prison, and their three children to the Halle Juvenile Detention Centre. A year later, in July 1982, they were considered 'unwanted', and ransomed by the West. They moved to West Germany and settled in Kaiserslautern. Wagner established himself as an expert for packaging, while continuing to design gliders. In 2011, he was awarded the Oskar Ursinus Prize.

The aircraft was examined by the State Aviation Authority of the GDR, who determined that it was probably the smallest five-person aircraft in the world, and would have been able to fly for the required half hour the trip would have taken. It was kept in the evidence chamber of the Stasi in East Berlin until the Peaceful Revolution in 1989.

Initially, the aircraft was preserved at the Stasi Museum, before being transferred to Flugwerft Schleissheim in Munich in 1991. In 2023, Wagner permanently loaned the aircraft to the Deutsch-Deutsches Museum Mödlareuth in Mödlareuth.

== Similar attempts ==
Wagner's airplane was not the only attempt at escaping the Eastern bloc using a homemade aircraft. In 1973, an Armenian named Henrik Arakelyan attempted to flee Armenia in a homemade aircraft, only for it to crash. Three years after Wagner's arrest, in 1984, Ivo Zdarsky, future founder of Ivoprop, successfully escaped communist Czechoslovakia to Austria in a homemade powered hang glider, which used an engine from a Trabant.

== Specifications ==
General Characteristics

- Crew: 5
- Wingspan: 9.0 metres
- Length: 5.85 metres
- Wing area: 8.61 square metres
- Empty mass: 240 kilograms
- Take-off mass: 580 kilograms
- Wing load: 67 kilograms/square metre

Performance

- Drive: Two 19 hp motorcycle engines
- Flight speed: max. 210 km/h, min. 90 km/h
- Take-off distance: 450 metres
- Climb speed: 1.8 metres/second

== Gallery ==
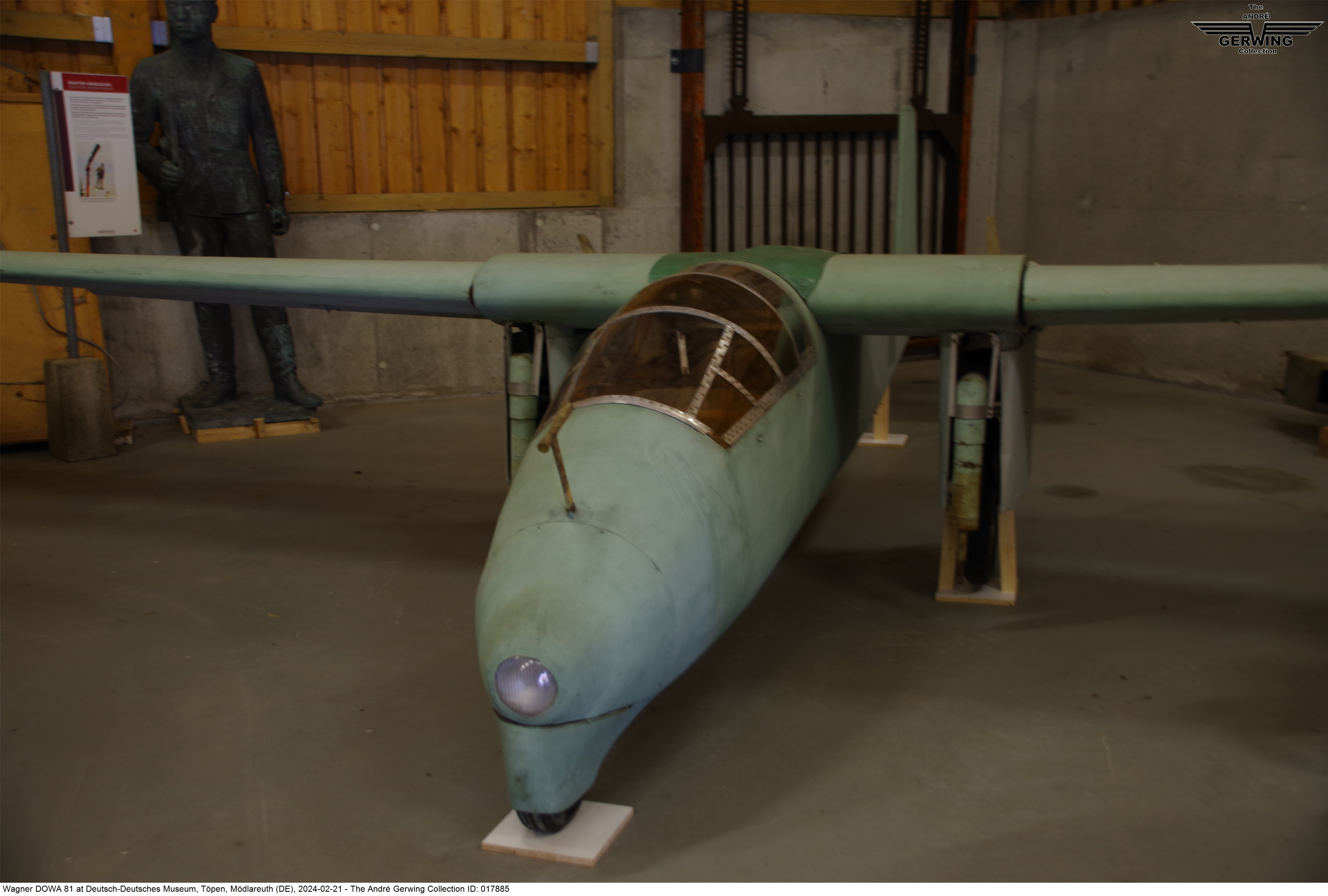
View from the front

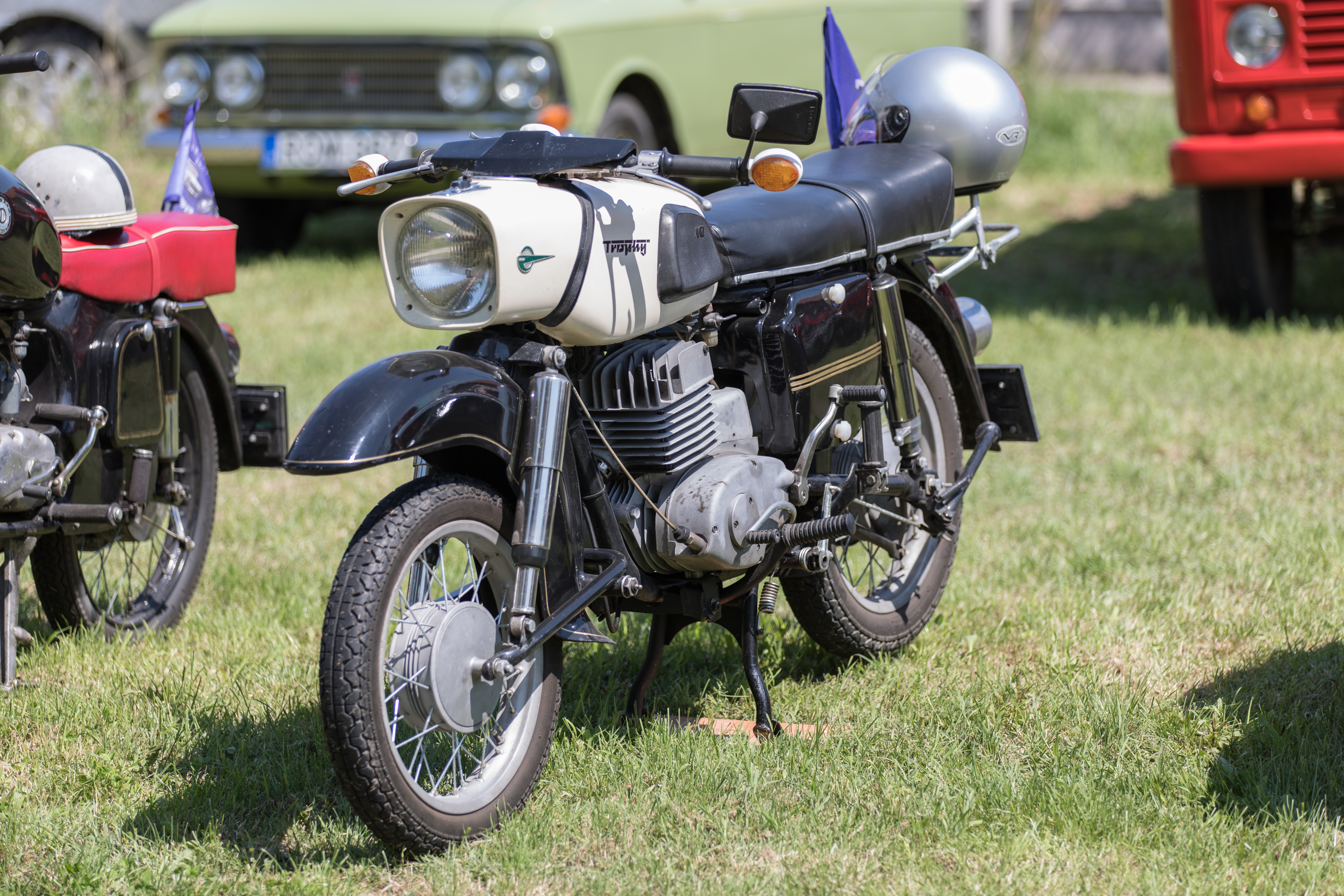
MZ ES 250/2 motorcycle

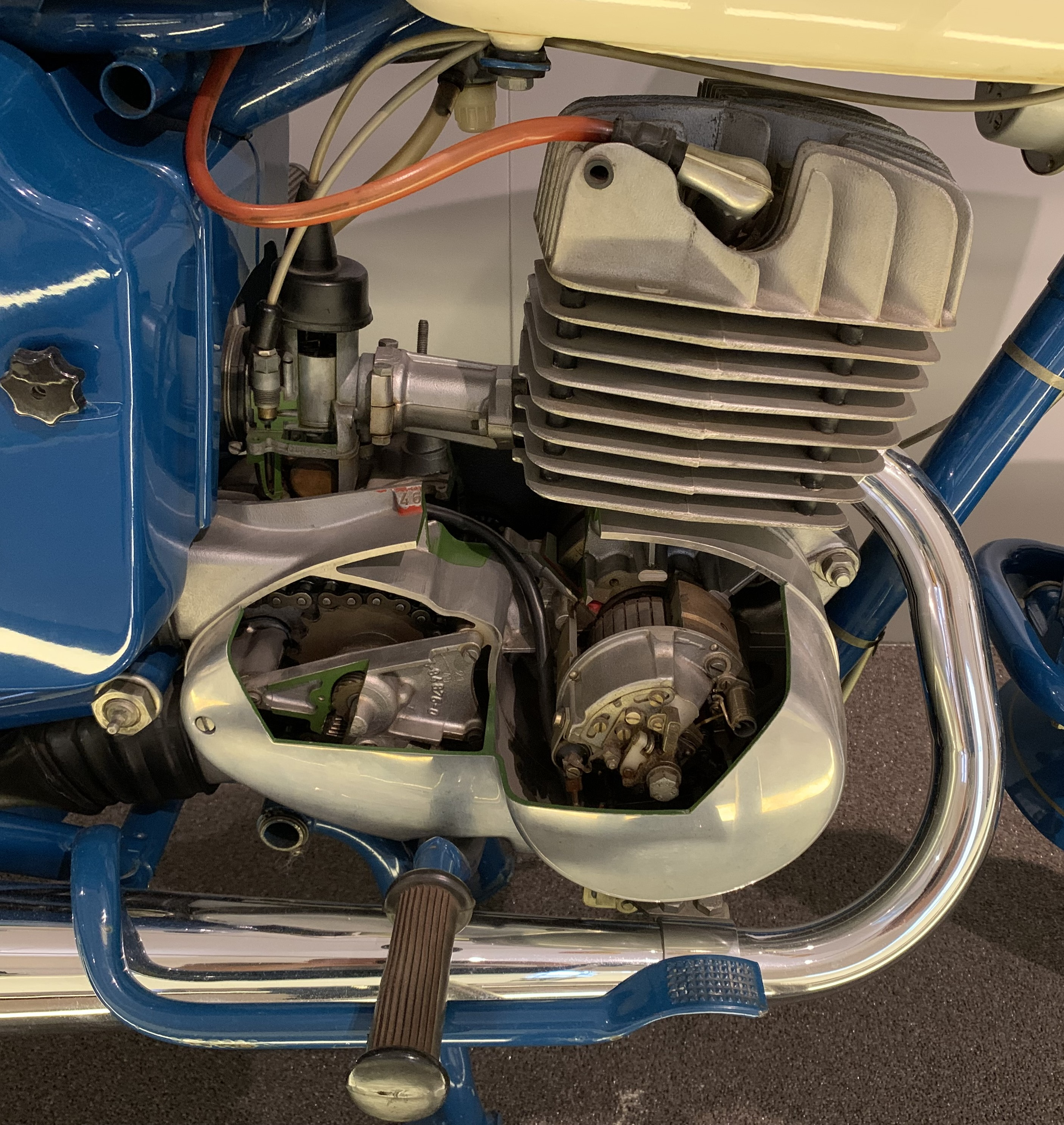
MZ ES 250/2 engine

== See also ==
- East Germany balloon escape, a successful escape from East Germany using a homemade aircraft
- Colditz Cock, built by Allied POWs for the purpose of escaping Oflag IV-C
