= Prisoner of War (video game) =

2002 video game

- Developer: Wide Games
- Publisher: Codemasters
- Platforms: PlayStation 2, Xbox, Windows
- Release: PlayStation 2, Xbox: UK: July 19, 2002; AU: July 2002; NA: August 20, 2002 (Xbox); Windows: UK: September 27, 2002; NA: October 2, 2002; AU: October 18, 2002
- Genre: Stealth
- Mode: Single player

Prisoner of War is a 2002 third-person stealth video game developed by Wide Games and published by Codemasters. It follows the story of Captain Lewis Stone, a downed American pilot who must escape numerous prisoner of war camps and return home.

== Gameplay ==
Prisoner of War is quite different from other stealth games, in that, although other stealth games utilise some small form of violence for the player to achieve his objectives, this game portrays little to no violence. For example, if the German guards on duty spot the player acting suspiciously, they call on the player to cease his activity rather than shooting on sight. If the player continues to disobey, however, the guard will shoot. There are other similar scenarios for the player losing. If the player is near the guard when he is caught acting suspiciously, he will automatically surrender and lose. These scenarios open up a whole new dimension of ideas for the player to achieve his objectives, but the key aspect to the completion of this game is stealth. It also, objectively, makes the game extremely difficult to complete. Furthermore, the game does not provide the player any combat mechanics; the player is unable to fight or kill any of their opponents and is instead required to complete their objectives through the use of stealth and deception.

In many escape attempts during World War II, success has been based on individuals working together towards a final escape. Prisoner of War is no exception, in that the key to a successful escape attempt is through the player interacting with the other inmates in the camp. This interaction is portrayed in the game by allowing the player to choose from a number of dialogue options for which his fellow inmates will respond. Fellow inmates are always willing to help out and provide information either for free, or for a certain fee.

Captain Stone has many items that he can use around the camp; these include items useful for opening doors, such as keys or crowbars. There is also currency that can be found in and around the camp. This can be used to purchase information, or other useful items. To avoid detection, these things can be hidden in the 'Hiding Place' in your barracks. Captain Stone is, like any escapee, equipped with a journal to store useful information, such as maps or current objectives.

== Plot ==
The game begins with Captain Stone, a shot down USAAF pilot who finds himself in a small holding camp with several other prisoners. He meets the other prisoners and goes around the camp doing tasks to help other prisoners who will, in turn, help him escape. He steals some currency, candy, and cigarettes, which he trades for some boot polish which he can use to darken his face and sneak around at night. Stone's friend JD, who was shot down with him, is eventually caught and brought to the camp, and with the information JD gives Stone they hatch an escape attempt. After a well thought out escape they are soon captured by Nazi General Stahl. Stahl kills JD for refusing to surrender and Stone reluctantly gives up. This causes Stone to develop a deep hatred that stays with him throughout the remainder of the war.

Stone is transferred to Stalag Luft where he meets a friendly British RAF officer and an unfriendly Polish officer who head the escape committee. After escaping through an abandoned tunnel, Stone is captured by a German patrol. He is sent to the infamous Colditz Castle.

Stone is placed in with the non-troublesome group of prisoners. He tries to meet a British prisoner named Roger Harding whom he briefly met at Stalag Luft, before was transferred, who tells him that he must escape back into Stalag Luft. Stone escapes through the sewers of Colditz and is captured outside of the camp and is thrown in with the other prisoners because the Kommandant does not want General Stahl to hear of his faults.

Stone is sent on a mission by the escape committee to steal secret German documents (of the rocket) and to take photos of a new V-2 rocket that is being built in the camp, so that Allied bombers will not bomb the camp. The escape committee analyzes the document and conclude they do not have time to contact London, which is the rocket's target, by mail. They then decide to execute plan B. Stone is sent to call the bombers with the German radio. When the alarms sound, the prisoners prepare a mass escape and General Stahl orders the launch of the rocket immediately. Stone goes to the laboratory and hides himself from the Germans while disabling the rocket. General Stahl demands its launch, holding the Kommandant at gunpoint, before the rocket is destroyed, and becomes disappointed in the performance of the rockets and goes to Colditz Castle to look into the secret experiments in the castle.

Back in the courtyard of Colditz, Stone is discovered in the trunk of the General's car. With the German officer mistakenly believing Stone to have accidentally wound up in another prisoner of war camp, he gives Stone double rations for brightening his day. The escape committee reveals to Stone that Harding was building the famous Colditz Glider in the chapel attic. Stone finds the necessary pieces to complete the glider and successfully escapes from the castle, killing General Stahl in the process.

== Reception ==
Reception

Aggregate score
Aggregator	Score
Metacritic	64/100 (PC); 64/100 (Xbox)

Review scores
Publication	Score
Eurogamer	8/10 (PS2)
GameSpot	6.8/10 (Xbox); 7/10 (PC)
GameSpy	3.5/5
IGN	6.9/10
Official Xbox Magazine (US)	5.9/10
PC Zone	77%

Prisoner of War was a nominee for PC Gamer US's "2002 Best Adventure Game" award, which ultimately went to Syberia. The PC Gameplay Magazine regarded the game as "The most unique game of 2002".

The game sold more than 30,000 units in the United States.
