= TWOW =

TWOW can refer to:

- Avatar: The Way of Water, a 2022 science fiction film
- The Winds of Winter, a planned novel by George R. R. Martin
- "The Winds of Winter" (Game of Thrones), an episode of Game of Thrones
- The Winds of War, a 1971 novel
- The Winds of War (miniseries), a 1983 miniseries

== See also ==
- TWOWS
- Winds of War (disambiguation)
