= Every Day I Wake Up on the Wrong Side of Capitalism =

Studio album by Sun Rise Above
- Released: July 7, 2011
- Recorded: 2011
- Genre: Hardcore hip hop, underground hip hop, political hip hop
- Length: 42:54
- Producer: Sun Rise Above, 7Wounds, Rendesten, KP, X3M

Professional ratings
Review scores
Source	Rating
The Red Phoenix	Favorable
RapReviews.com	6.5/10 stars

Every Day I Wake Up on the Wrong Side of Capitalism is an album by rapper Sun Rise Above.

== Track listing ==
1. Root and Branch (01:51)
2. The Ashes of Eagles (01:18)
3. Stockholm Syndrome (03:14)
4. Incarceration (01:18)
5. The Anti-Capitalistic Mentality (02:52)
6. Every Day (I Wake Up) (02:51)
7. Mon River Flow (03:41)
8. Love Hate Relationship (01:36)
9. What's the Point? (01:39)
10. Prelude to a Revolution (00:38)
11. Kamikaze (03:34)
12. Yea Right (01:32)
13. Illegal (featuring Truth Universal) (03:28)
14. Blood (On Your Loafers) (01:42)
15. Obomba (02:14)
16. Law and Order (featuring 7Wounds) (01:45)
17. Surrender (01:39)
18. The Rub (01:33)
19. Blow (00:49)
20. Memorial Day (Interlude) (00:44)
21. The Human Cost (03:12)
