= Sun Rise Above =

American rapper

- Also known as: Sun R.A.
- Genres: Hip hop
- Instrument: Rapping
- Years active: 2003—present
- Labels: Bare Regular, Guerrilla Funk
- Website: sunriseabove.bandcamp.com

Sun Rise Above, also known as Sun R. A., is a hip hop artist, notable for his leftist political views and corresponding lyrics. Described as a "highly politicized rapper who manages to convey his ideological leanings in an approachable fashion", Sun Rise Above has been compared to acts like Public Enemy and the Wu-Tang Clan, as well as contemporary political rappers such as Dead Prez and Immortal Technique.

Sun Rise Above released his debut album Global Warning in 2003. In 2005, Paris signed Sun R.A. to his Guerrilla Funk imprint and an appearance on political hip hop compilation Paris Presents: Hard Truth Soldiers Vol.1 followed. Solo album Prisoners of War (recorded 2004), originally scheduled for release through Guerrilla Funk, was eventually released independently in 2009. A single from the album, "Free Your Mind," was released on vinyl by Finnish record label Traveller Records.

Despite a lack of mainstream attention, Sun Rise Above has received press coverage internationally. Critically acclaimed album Every Day I Wake Up On The Wrong Side Of Capitalism was released on July 2, 2011.

== Discography ==
=== Albums ===
- 2003 - Global Warning
- 2005 - This Means War
- 2005 - United Front
- 2006 - Paris presents Hard Truth Soldiers, Vol. 1 (featured on "Throwyahandzup" with Dead Prez and T-K.A.S.H.)
- 2009 - Prisoners of War
- 2009 - 48 Hours Toward A Better World
- 2011 - Every Day I Wake Up On The Wrong Side Of Capitalism
- 2011 - More Fucking Life
- 2011 - Forward Motion
- 2011 - Still Prisoners of War
- 2012 - Cultural Revolution
- 2012 - Nuclear Man
- 2021 - Revolutionary Warfare

=== Singles/EPs ===
- 2007 - "Free Your Mind"/"Stop"
- 2011 - Enero EP
