= WOW Film Festival =

WOW Film Festival may refer to one of these film festivals:

- For Film's Sake, formerly World of Women’s Cinema (WOW) Film Festival, in Sydney, Australia
- Wales One World Film Festival, in Aberystwyth, Wales, UK
