= Pow (surname) =

Pow is a surname. Notable people with the surname include:

- Duncan Pow (born 1980), Scottish actor
- Luca Pow (born 2005), British tennis player
- Rebecca Pow (born 1960), British politician
- Robert Pow (1883–1958), Canadian politician

It may also be a romanization of the Chinese surnames 包 Bāo or 鮑/鲍 Bào

- Shane Pow (born 1990), Singaporean actor
