= Wall of Wind =

Wind engineering testing facility

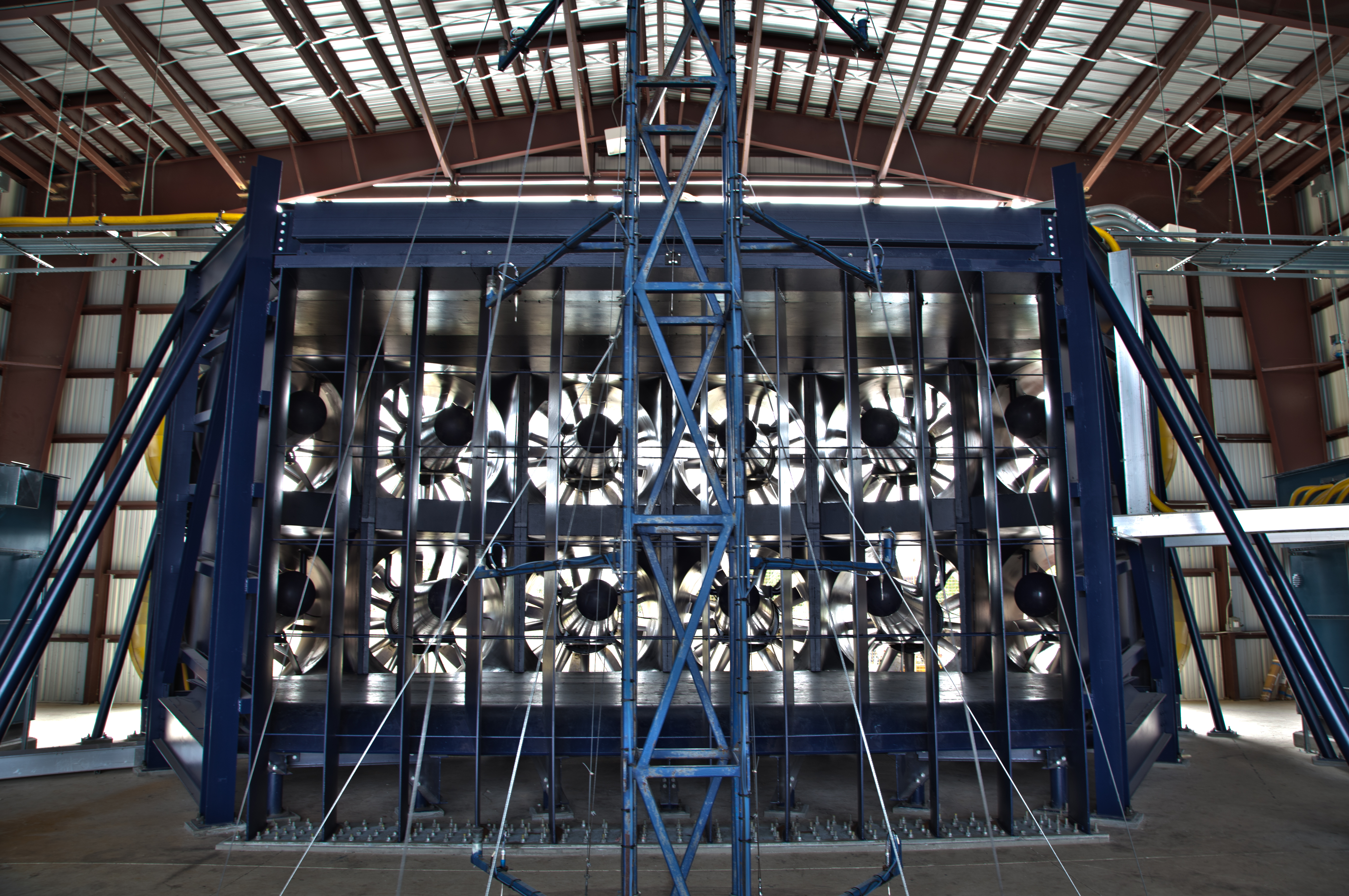
The rear of the Wall of Wind

The Wall of Wind (WoW) is a large scale wind engineering testing facility at Florida International University. The original version, with two fans, was completed in 2005 and upgraded to six fans in 2007—sufficient to generate winds of up to 120 miles per hour (190 km/h). After being upgraded to 12 fans in 2012, the Wall of Wind became capable of generating winds of 157 miles per hour (253 km/h), near the top wind speed of 1992's Hurricane Andrew; this made it the only facility at a university that could generate Category 5 hurricane wind speeds.

In addition to aerodynamic test at large-scale and high wind speeds, the facility allows for wind-driven rain testing of building envelopes as well as destructive testing of low-rise test buildings constructed with actual materials. Testing on the earlier Wall of Wind setups led to the design of screens for rooftop air conditioners that reduce wind pressure by up to 58 percent and which were adopted into Florida building codes. At a media preview of the upgraded Wall of Wind in 2012, a demonstration between roofs built under pre- and post-Andrew codes was conducted. In 2015, the National Science Foundation (NSF) selected the Wall of Wind as one of the nation's major "Experimental Facilities" under the Natural Hazards Engineering Research Infrastructure (NHERI) competition.

Because of the increasing wind speeds associated with storms such as Hurricane Dorian and the fact that the Wall of Wind cannot account for wave damage, FIU scientists in 2022 received a $12.8 million NSF grant to develop a new testing system known as National Full-Scale Testing Infrastructure for Community Hardening in Extreme Wind, Surge, and Wave Events (NICHE).
