= Pow-Wow Oak Tree =

Historic tree in Massachusetts

Coordinates: 42.63902°N 71.27337°W

Pow-Wow Oak
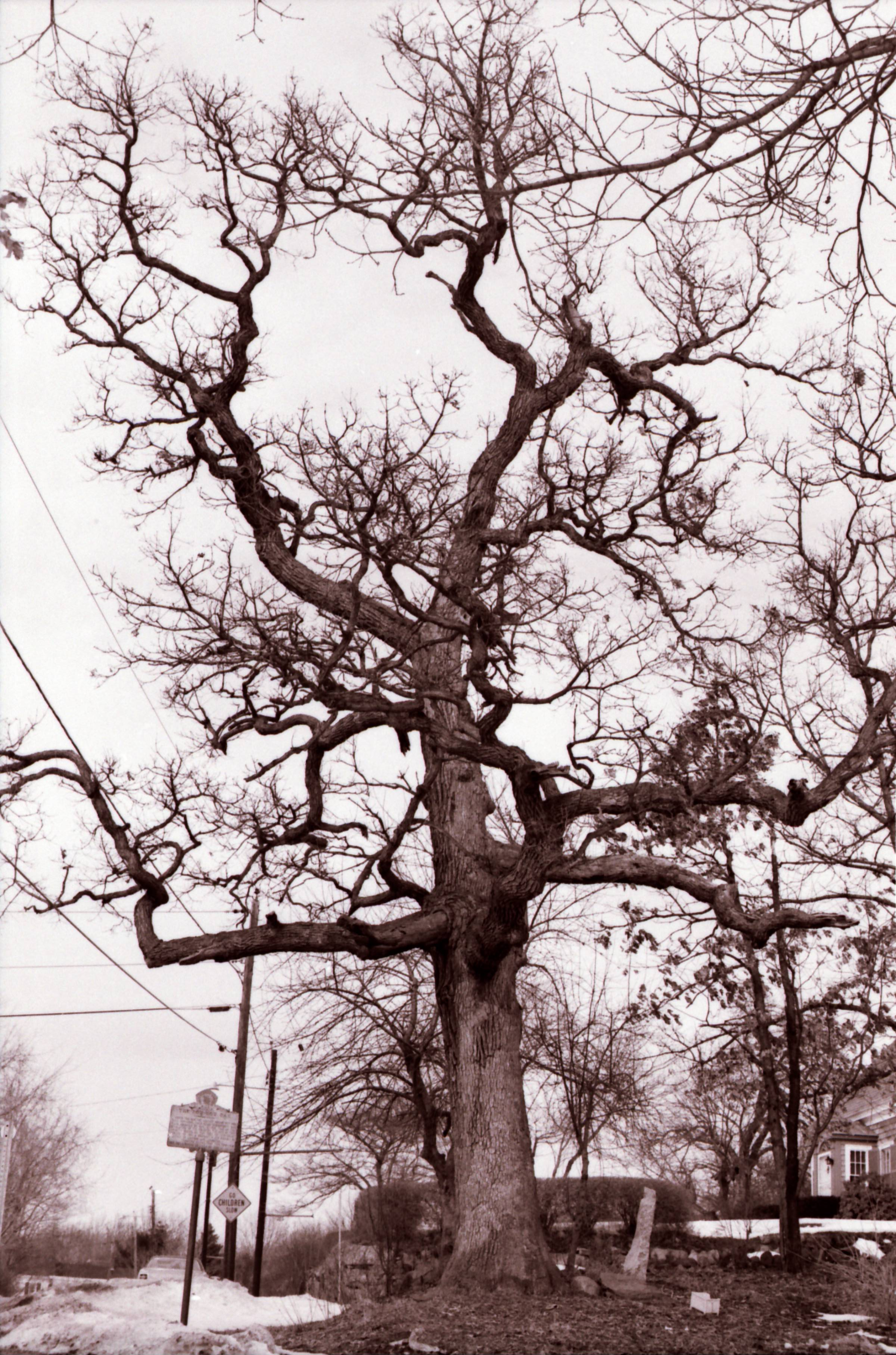
- Pow-Wow Oak in 1974
- Interactive map of Pow-Wow Oak
- Species: Quercus alba
- Date felled: May 22, 2013
- Custodian: Pow-Wow Oak Protectors

The Pow-Wow Oak (c. 1700 – May 22, 2013) was an historic tree located in the Belvidere neighborhood of Lowell, Massachusetts, near the Tewksbury town line. The white oak tree was estimated to have been over 300 years old before it was cut down in 2013 due to safety concerns following a storm. The tree once served as a gathering place for pow wows held by Native Americans in Wamesit. During the American Revolutionary War, the tree stood on a bridle path used by local Minutemen on their way to fight in the Battles of Lexington and Concord.

== History ==
The area where the Pow-Wow Oak once stood was part of Wamesit, a prayer town established by Reverend John Eliot in 1653. Indigenous peoples living there included members of the Pawtucket, Pennacook, Nipmuc, and Massachusett tribes. The tree was the site of powwows, as well as tribal councils where leaders discussed matters of diplomacy and war. Powwows were technically illegal in the Massachusetts Bay Colony, and with the encroachment of English settlers, much of the Native population was eventually pushed out of the area.

During Paul Revere's midnight ride, Captain John Trull of the local Minutemen in Tewksbury fired three warning shots from his farm in the early morning of April 19, 1775, to relay the message about approaching British troops. Hearing the signal, Captain Joseph Varnum of Dracut led his men on horseback past the Pow-Wow Oak en route to the Tewksbury town center, where they joined the company on its march to defend Concord and Lexington, in the first major actions of the American Revolutionary War.

== Preservation ==
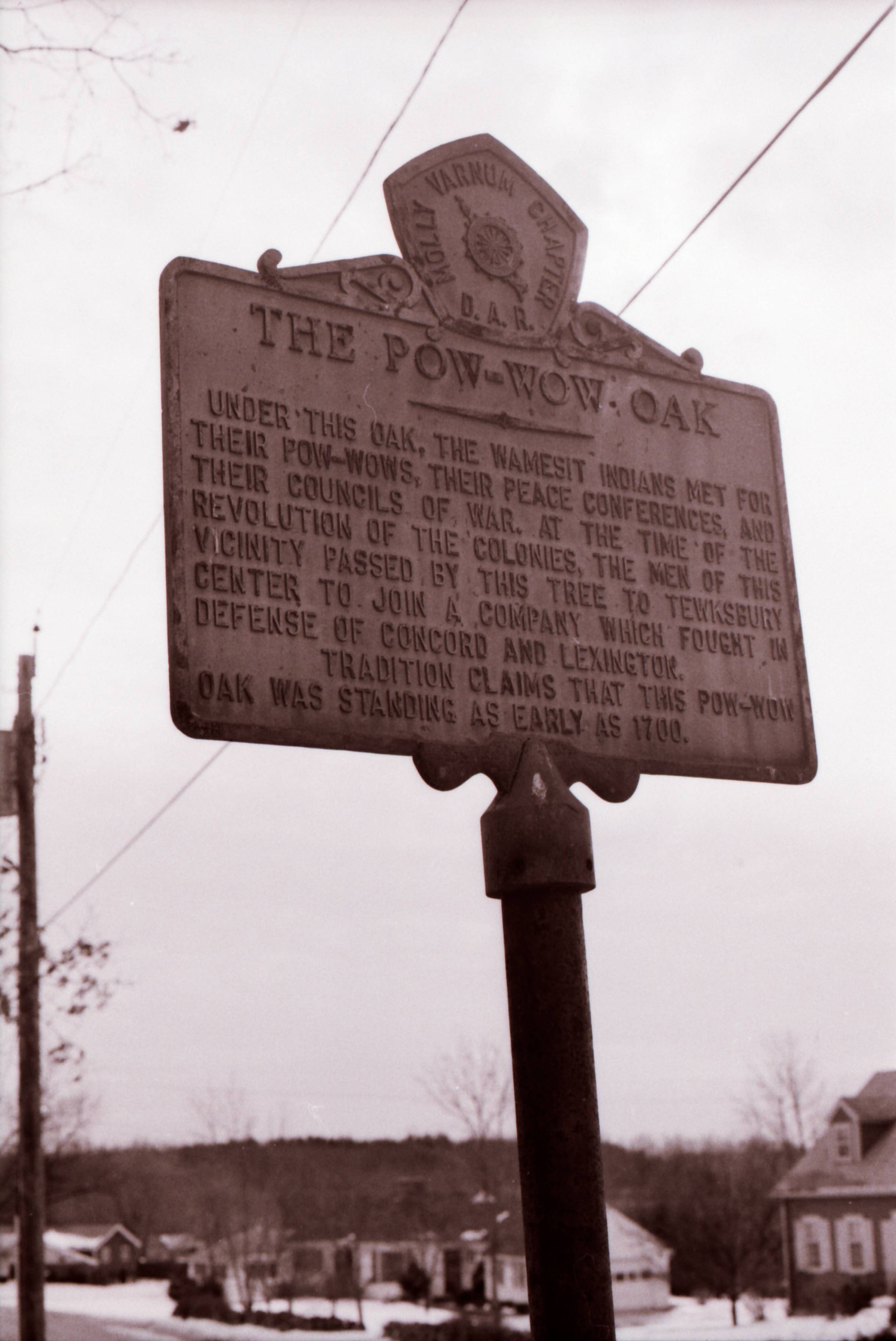
Pow-Wow Oak Commemorative Sign, January 1974

As of 1909, the Pow-Wow Oak was located on a parcel of land owned by the city of Lowell. Around that time, the city considered removing the tree to accommodate the proposed widening and paving of Clark Road. In May 1910, resident Albert E. O'Heir, who lived on Clark Road opposite the Pow-Wow Oak, offered to donate land on his side of the road to the city, so that the street could be widened without cutting down the tree. City officials confirmed that this would make it possible to save the Pow-Wow Oak, which at the time was the oldest living tree in Lowell.

On May 28, 1931, the Molly Varnum Chapter of the Daughters of the American Revolution (DAR) erected a cast-iron sign on a low post under the tree to commemorate the ancient oak, the Wamesit Indians, and the local militia who faught in the Battles of Lexington and Concord. The land surrounding the tree had been cleared by the local park commission to make the Pow-Wow Oak more prominent.

=== Protectors ===
In 2010, the Lowell Sun reported a local group called the Pow-Wow Oak Protectors were campaigning to preserve and protect the tree. Led by long-time resident George Koumantzelis, the group had successfully petitioned to have the Pow-Wow Oak certified and registered in the National Register of Champion Trees maintained by American Forests that year. Concern for the health of the tree had grown after the owner of the house behind the tree erected a steel fence around it in 2009, believing it was part of his property. Upon examining the Pow-Wow Oak, local arborist John Coppinger reported that the tree was in "great jeopardy" due to landscaping changes which had damaged its roots and branches. There were also signs of internal decay. The city confirmed its ownership of the tree and the fence was taken down in 2010.

In June 2011, the Pow-Wow Oak Protectors held a benefit concert to raise funds for a surveyor to do a survey, and pay for four granite boundary markers to be placed around the tree. Copies of The Last Pow-Wow Oak, a documentary film by Andrew Szava-Kovats of True Age Media, were also sold at the concert.

In 2012, the Pow-Wow Oak was granted a Preservation Covenant by the City of Lowell. In September 2012, the Pow-Wow Oak Protectors dedicated a new 7-foot (2.1 m) granite monument built by Adrian Luz. The group also restored the 1931 DAR sign and installed stone markers.

== Removal ==
During a storm on May 21, 2013, at around 12:45 pm, a massive upper branch of the Pow-Wow Oak fell onto Clark Road, bringing several other branches down with it, and leaving a single limb hanging across power lines. No one was hurt and no cars were damaged, but some homes experienced power outages.

An arborist examined the tree trunk, which showed extensive internal decay, and determined that the tree posed a safety hazard to pedestrians and motorists. Lowell city officials decided to remove the tree, and on the late morning of May 22, 2013, the Pow-Wow Oak was cut down by contractors using a crane and chainsaws. The Pow-Wow Oak Protectors' George Koumantzelis, who had been out of town when the tree was cut down, expressed shock at how "hastily" the city had acted. He told the Tewksbury Town Crier that even if the upper part of the tree was rotten, an attempt could have been made to improve the health of the bottom part of the tree.

== Legacy ==
=== Bark ===
In 1971, a large section of weathered, grey bark from the Pow-Wow Oak was donated to the Indian collection of the Chelmsford Historical Society. Lowell had previously been part of the town of Chelmsford.

=== Trunk ===
Following the tree's removal in 2013, only a stump remained where the Pow-Wow Oak had once stood. Around 50 pieces of the tree were delivered by the city to Koumantzelis. With so much of the trunk cut down, it was impossible to carve a 20-foot (6.1 m) totem pole as the Protectors had wished.

Since 2015, a large portion of the trunk of the Pow-Wow Oak has been on permanent display at Peter W. Reilly Elementary School in Lowell. The piece is over 3 feet (0.91 m) tall and weighs over 400 pounds (180 kg). A plaque explaining its history accompanies the display.

=== Stump ===
As of May 2019, a 7-foot (2.1 m) maple tree sapling was growing out of the stump of the Pow-Wow Oak. The commemorative D.A.R. sign, the granite monument, and the stone markers continued to stand at the stump on Clark Road. The public lot, which remains protected by the city covenant, was being maintained by the Protectors, who weed, mow the lawn, and spread mulch.

== Gallery ==
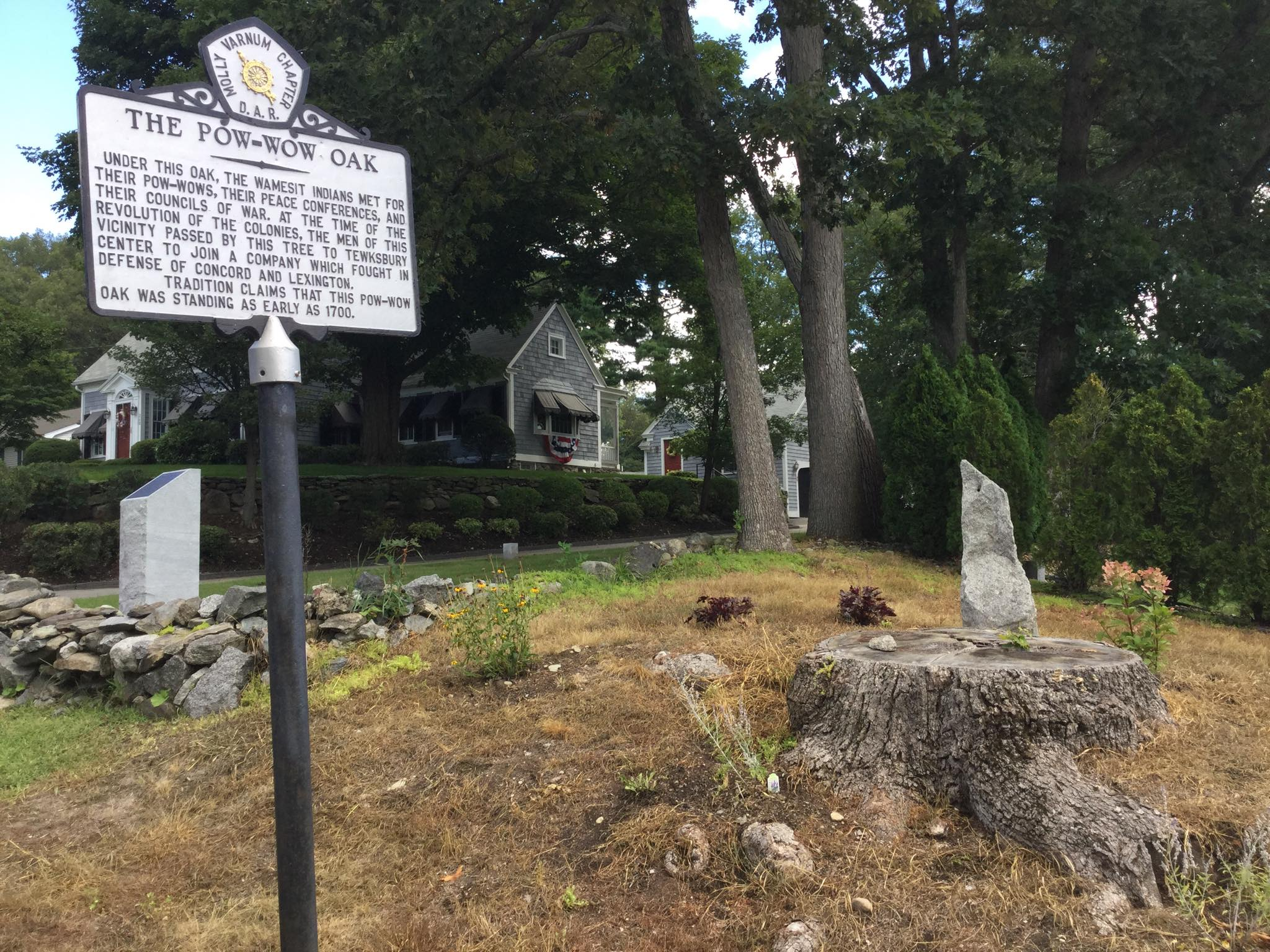
After the Pow-Wow Oak was taken down – sign, monument and stump

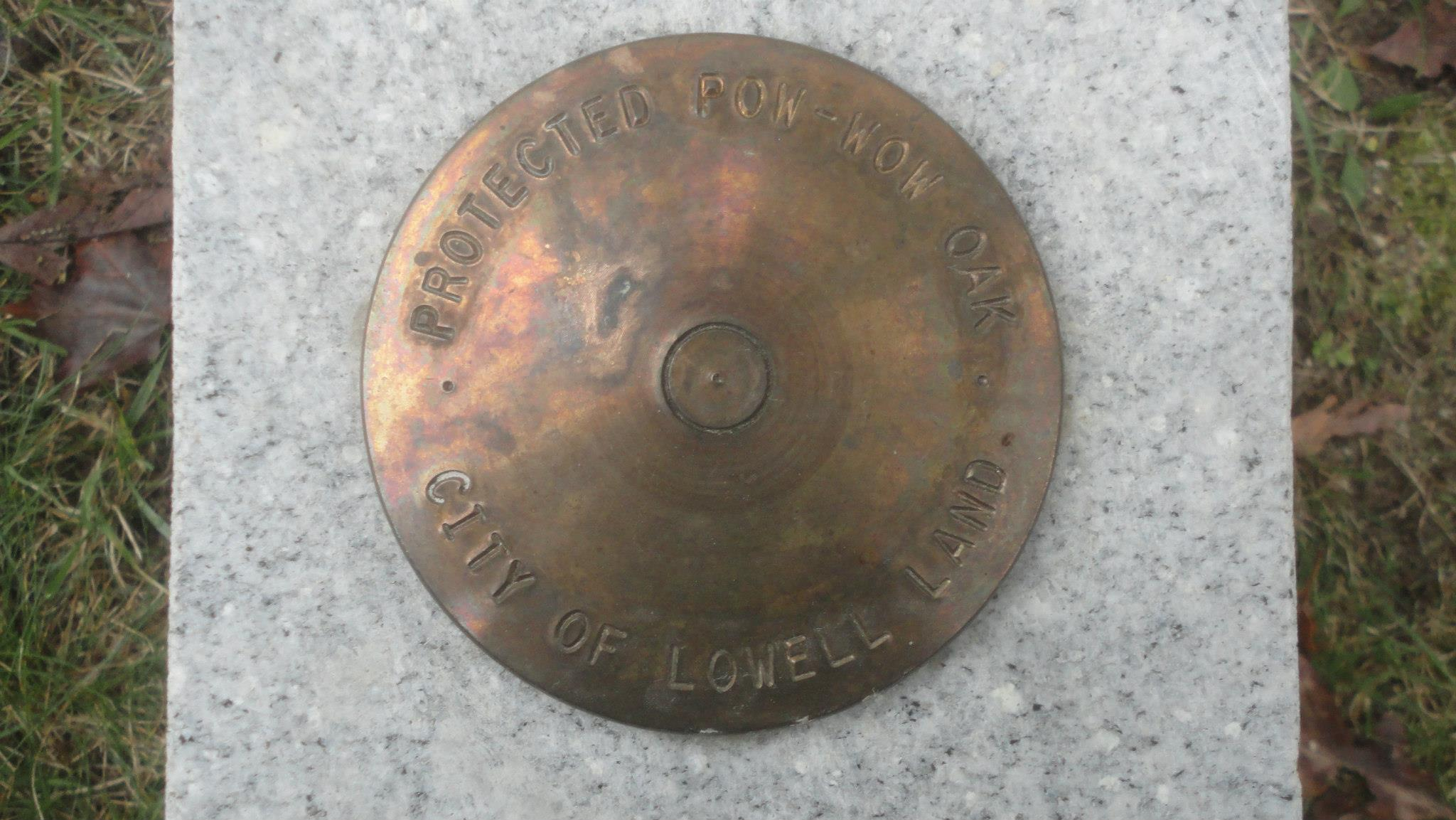
Pow-Wow Oak stone marker

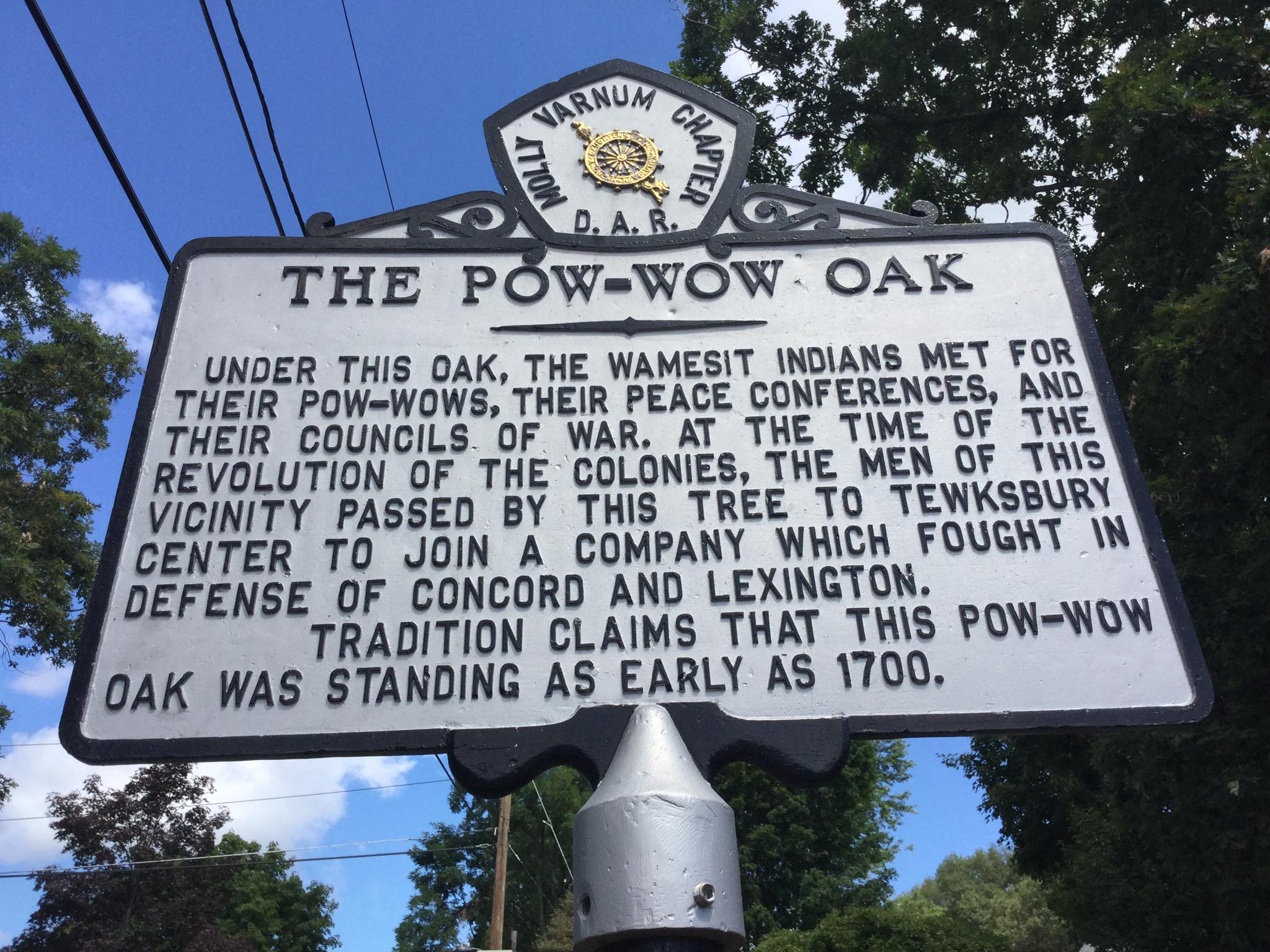
Pow-Wow Oak DAR sign

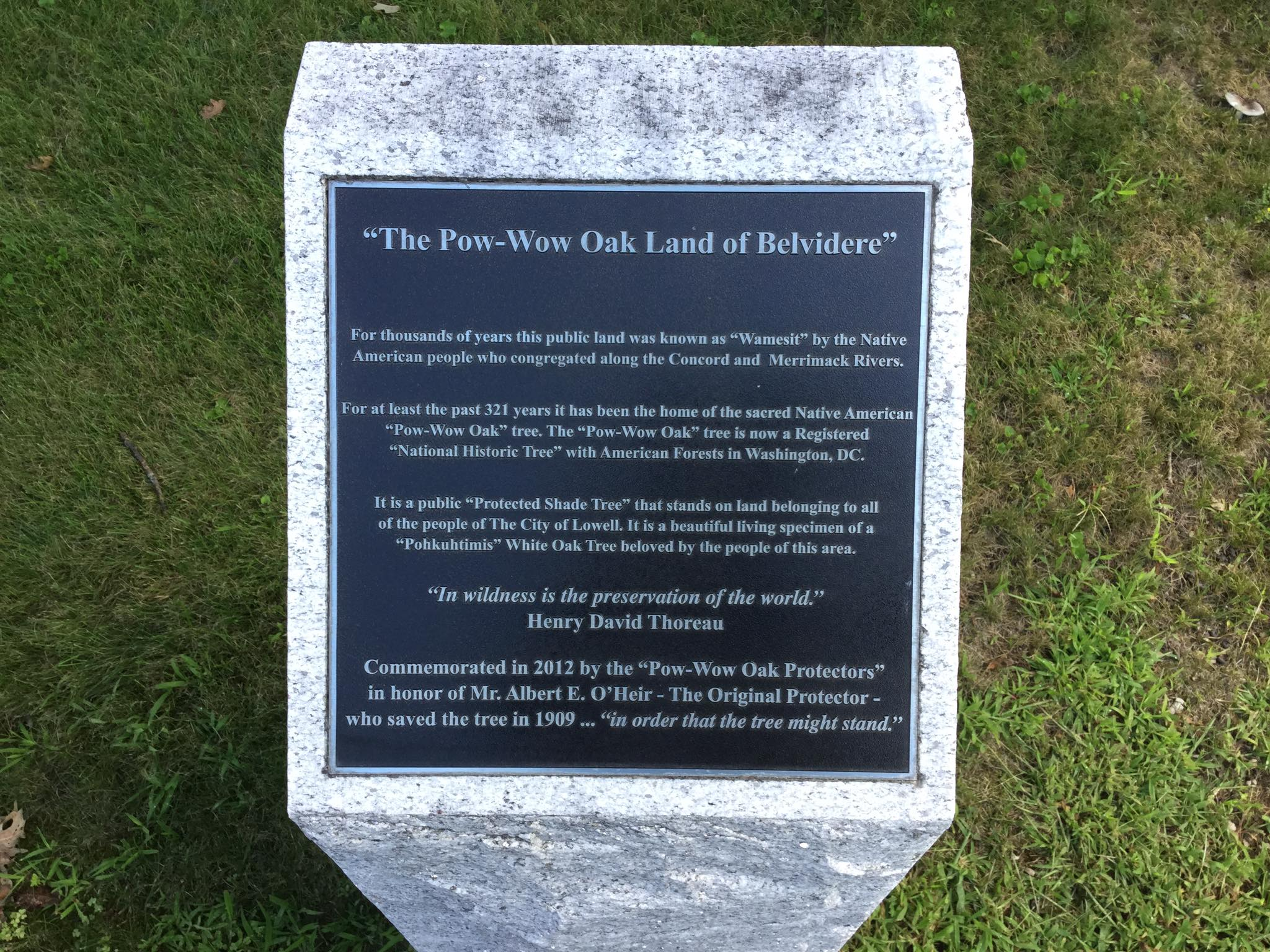
Monument

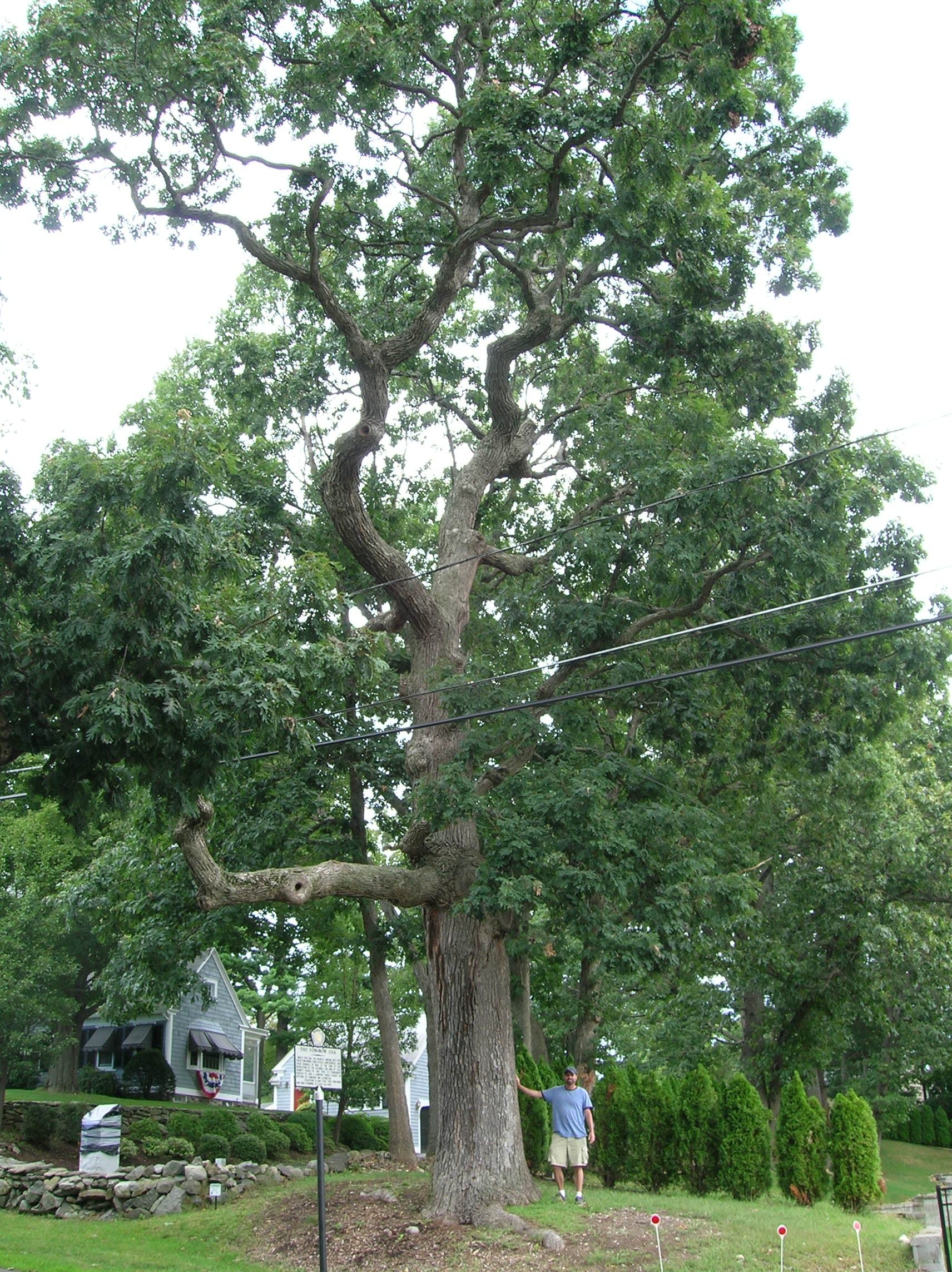
Pow-Wow Oak in Lowell, MA, September 2012

== See also ==
- Lowell, Massachusetts
- History of Lowell, Massachusetts
