= Lee Carson =

American journalist and war correspondent

Lee Carson Reeves
- Born: 1921/1922?
- Died: April 5, 1973; Overbrook, PA
- Other name: Lee Carson
- Occupation: War Correspondent
- Years active: 1940–1957
- Notable work: first-hand reports from the front-lines in Europe during World War II
- Spouse: Jay Reeves

Lee Carson Reeves (1921/1922? – 1973) was an American journalist. In World War II, she served as a war correspondent covering front line combat in the European theater from 1943 to 1946. She received the International News Service Medal of Honor in 1945 and the National Headliners Club Award for outstanding achievement. According to British journalist and author, Ben Macintyre, Carson "was one of the finest war reporters of the twentieth century: resourceful, resilient, witty and astonishingly brave."

== Early life ==
Carson attended Smith College at the age of 14 but by 16 she left to become a reporter for the Chicago Daily Times. She also contributed articles to Good Housekeeping, Ladies Home Journal and Harper’s Bazaar.

== Career ==
Carson joined the International News Service in 1940. She was made a war correspondent in 1943. J.C. Oestreicher, head of overseas news for the Hearst Group in New York, personally sent Carson to France to cover the war. After the war, Carson also studied at the Ecole Anglaise in Paris.

Dubbed the "best-looking war correspondent" by Newsweek, Carson was said to use this toward her advantage; but never let that distract from her job. In an article for Look magazine, Carson said: “the best break I got in war of preparation for the battle front came … when I was born into a family of outspoken, uninhibited sons.” Fighter pilot Colonel Hubert Zemke recalled how in the spring of 1944, Carson while visiting the 56th Fighter Group talked a pilot into allowing her board a spotter plane on D-Day.

While, some female nursing units arrived on the beaches of Normandy on D-Day, June 6, 1944, only male reporters were allowed to go due to a Supreme Headquarters Allied Expeditionary Force article of war regulation. Carson managed to bypass the restrictions by talking her way into a seat aboard a spotter airplane with an aerial view of the attack. Upon her return, Carson was able to cable a first hand eyewitness report of the invasion, days before other newsmen (who were still in France). When word circulated around the news desks, angry editors accused Carson of "batting her eyelashes" to get the story. SHAEF issued an order of discipline against her. Carson managed to elude military police and later went on to state: “Sure, I knew it [the policy that women could not cover the D-Day combat]. But my job was to get the news.”

Continuing her focus on getting the news, she and another female reporter (unofficially) attached themselves as embedded press corp members traveling with the U.S. Army. Surprised G.I.s sometimes confusingly addressed her as "Ma'am/Sir." Unlike her male colleagues, who used standard combat fatigues, she had to create her own uniform. Carson was the first Allied war correspondent to enter Paris after its liberation (partly by insisting she ride in the front seat of an army jeep in the right place at right time for going to the front, while a male Reuters reporter was relegated to the back.) Accompanying the 4th Army, she reported on the Paris civilians who resisted the occupation; and later crossed the Siegfried Line at Aachen with fellow war correspondent Iris Carpenter alongside the 1st Army. Carpenter and Carson both reported on the Battle of the Bulge and the first GIs encountering Soviet forces at the Elbe River. Given her bravery and tenacity, as well has her looks, the troops took to calling Carson the heroic "maiden of the Rhine". On April 15, 1945, Carson entered Colditz Castle near Leipzig, Germany (she had gotten an agreement to be with the surrender force, but unexpectedly the Germans surrendered the POW-prison to the four-man reconnaissance team). She prevailed on the former prisoners, surprised to see a woman, to take her on a tour of all their secret hiding places in the medieval castle and snapped the only photograph of the "cock" glider, built by inmates over the last year for an escape attempt hidden in the attic. On April 23, 1945, Carson witnessed the liberation of the Erla Work Camp at Leipzig.

On Saturday, June 16, 1945, Carson was awarded the Headliner medal from the National Headliners Club.

Carson retired from the International News Service and reporting in 1957.

== Personal life ==
Carson married CIA officer Jay Reeves after the war. She died of cancer at the age of 51 in 1973 at the Lankenau Hospital in Overbook, Pennsylvania.

== See also ==
- Lee Miller - an American woman World War II photographer and photojournalist, also named "Lee"
