= Prisoners of War (album) =

Studio album by Sun Rise Above
- Released: January 30, 2009
- Recorded: 2004
- Genre: Hardcore hip hop, underground hip hop, political hip hop
- Length: 35:38
- Label: Bare Regular Music
- Producer: Sun Rise Above, 7Wounds, Rendesten, KP, Crippled Chemist

Singles from Prisoners of War
- 1. "Free Your Mind / Stop "

Professional ratings
Review scores
Source	Rating
RapReviews.com	6.5/10 stars

Prisoners of War is an album by rapper Sun Rise Above.

== Track listing ==
1. Prelude/The Jump (2:34)
2. Break the Chain (3:29)
3. Prisoners of War (2:06)
4. Make a Move (3:26)
5. Dollar Bill (2:29)
6. Get a Job (1:18)
7. Grow (3:41)
8. Hang Over (3:00)
9. Time Is Now (2:36)
10. Free Your Mind (2:49)
11. Fuck the System (3:00)
12. Guerrilla Warfare (1:09)
13. Stop (3:08)
14. Epilogue (0:53)
