= Anthony Bridgman =

Royal Air Force officer (1915–2006)

Anthony Orlando Bridgman
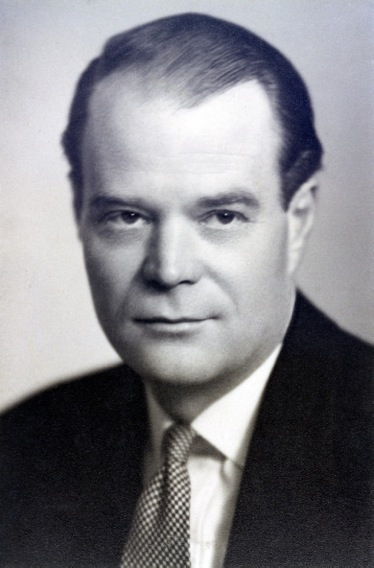
- Anthony Bridgman in 1949
- Born: Anthony Orlando Bridgman; June 4, 1915; North Stoke, Somerset, United Kingdom
- Died: January 14, 2006 (aged 90); Northam, North Devon, UK
- Education: Magdalen College School
- Awards: Distinguished Flying Cross
- Aviation career
- First flight: 1933; De Havilland Tiger Moth
- Air force: Royal Air Force
- Rank: Squadron Leader

Squadron Leader Anthony Orlando ‘Oscar’ Bridgman, DFC (4 June 1915 – 14 January 2006) was a bomber pilot of the Royal Air Force during the Second World War. He was awarded the Distinguished Flying Cross in 1940, and, during internment as a prisoner of war at Stalag Luft III, was a contributor in The Wooden Horse escape.

== Early life and education ==
Bridgman was born on June 4, 1915, in North Stoke, Somerset, in the parish of Keynsham, spending the first five years of his life in Munnar, Southern India, where his father managed a tea plantation. He returned to England to be educated at Magdalen College School, Oxford, where he pursued his interest in aviation and learned to fly, remaining there until he was eighteen. Bridgman joined the Royal Air Force in 1934 at age nineteen, based at RAF Thornaby in North Yorkshire.

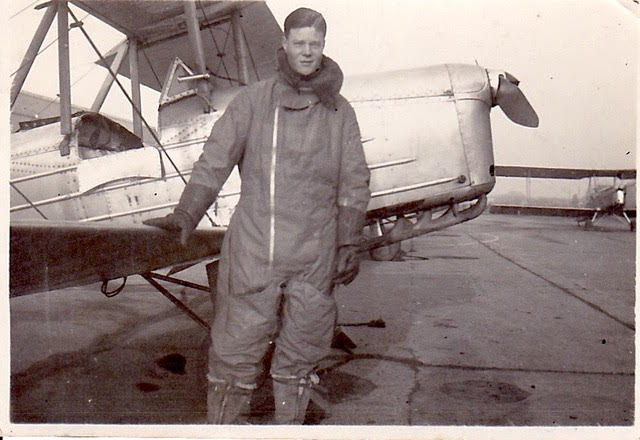
Anthony Bridgman in flight training with a De Havilland Tiger Moth at RAF Abingdon in 1933.

== RAF Service ==
On March 23, 1936, Bridgman was granted a service commission as Acting Pilot Officer On Probation. On January 27, 1937, he was commissioned as a Pilot Officer and posted to No. 2 Group, Bomber Command, and subsequently sent to No. 83 Squadron, a day bomber unit equipped with Hawker Hinds, at Turnhouse near Edinburgh. Declining to reveal his middle name as Orlando, he adopted the phonetic initial ‘Oscar’ which became his adopted nickname and by which he was known throughout his service years. His cadre of fellow junior officers at Turnhouse included James Pitcairn-Hill and John Collier, to be joined in September 1937 by Guy Gibson who was assigned into Bridgman’s care and tutelage, and would eventually become one of the most decorated World War Two British pilots. Squadron Leader Leonard Snaith, formerly of the winning 1931 Schneider Trophy Team, joined the squadron in June 1937 as Commanding Officer.

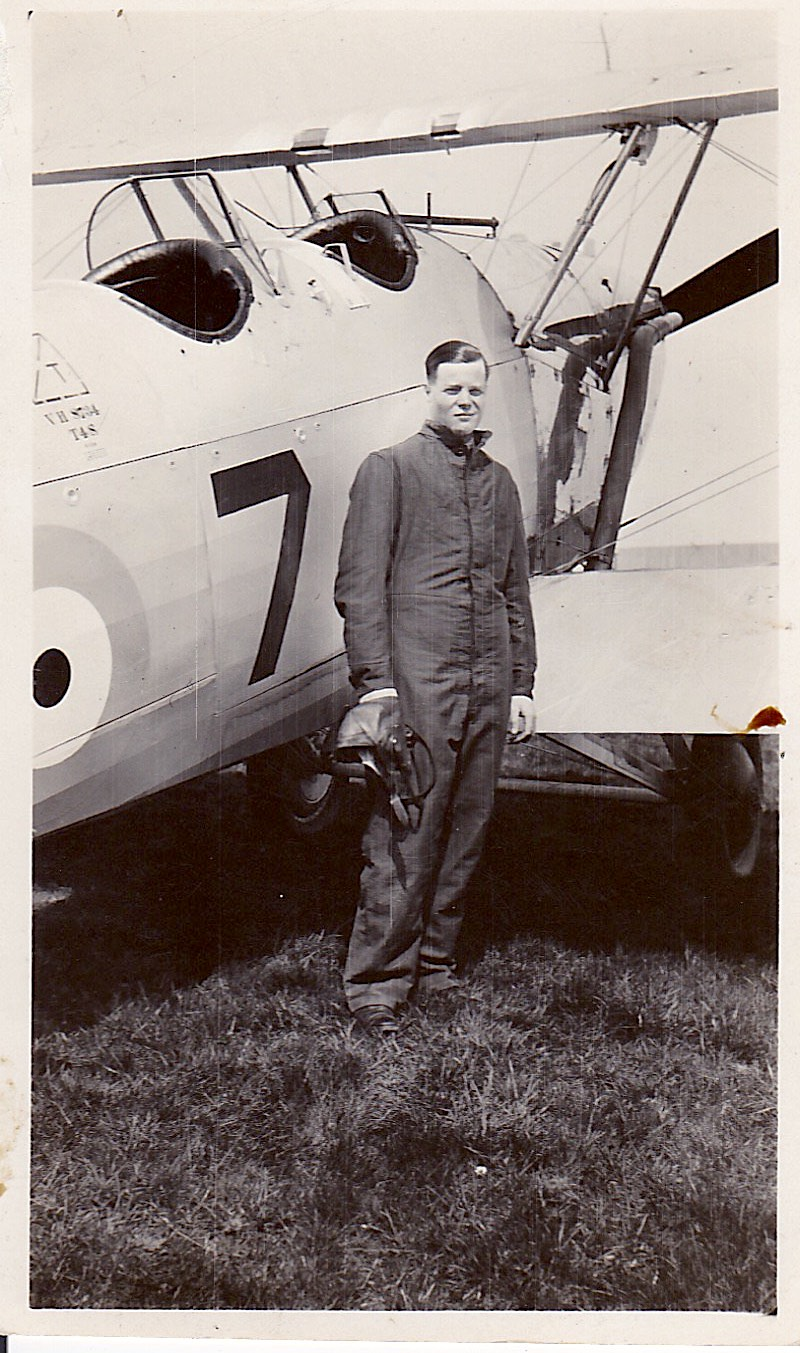
Anthony Bridgman with a Hawker Hart at RAF Thornaby, 1934.

In March 1938, No. 83 Squadron moved to RAF Scampton in Lincolnshire as part of No. 5 Group, Bomber Command, sharing Scampton with No. 49 Squadron. In May of the same year, Bridgman was made Acting Flying Officer and in August was promoted to the rank of Flying Officer and Acting Flight Commander of A Flight. Subsequently, No. 83 Squadron was re-equipped with the new Handley-Page Hampden, a fast, twin engine, monoplane medium bomber carrying a crew of four, dubbed 'The Flying Suitcase' for its cramped interior.

== World War II ==
In December 1939, three months after the outbreak of the Second World War, Bridgman was promoted to the rank of Flight Lieutenant and also Flight Commander of A Flight. No. 83 Squadron were to become specialists in low-altitude, precision bombing referred to as "gardening" – laying mines in various seaways and harbour entrances. With the German invasion of Denmark and Norway in April 1940, No. 83 Squadron started mining Baltic approaches to Kiel and harbour entrances on the Danish Coast to disrupt enemy shipping.

=== Distinguished Flying Cross ===
Returning from a mining mission over the entrance to the Skagerrak Strait on the night of April 17/18 1940, Bridgman and Australian Flying Officer Ellis Henry Ross in a second Hampden performed a reconnaissance flight over the newly established Aalborg aerodrome. Aalborg was an important hub ferrying troops and supplies into Denmark and Norway. A subsequent bombing mission on the night of April 20/21 was executed with success by the two crews, with Bridgman, Ross, and their respective navigators awarded the Distinguished Flying Cross.

=== Capture ===
By 1940 Berlin had become a recognised target by Bomber Command as the Germans were bombing London. On the night of September 23/24 1940, a force of over 200 RAF bombers was sent to raid Berlin. Eleven of those aircraft were the Hampdens of No. 83 Squadron, led by Bridgman.

Flying Hampden L4049, code letters OL-A, Bridgman executed the attack; however, one 500 lb bomb failed to leave the aircraft. As they passed to the South-west of Bremen, more than halfway back to the German coast and on a direct route home, the Hampden was found by German searchlights and anti-aircraft fire and subsequently crippled. With one engine damaged the aircraft was hit again and the order given to bail out. The Hampden crashed in a field behind a barn near Bethen, Niedersachsen, Germany.

Bridgman, as the only survivor, was captured and sent to the Dulag Luft at Oberursel, a holding centre for new prisoners of war (POW), and within a month, to Oflag IX-A at Spangenberg Castle to begin life as a POW, transferring from camp to camp throughout the duration of the war.

=== Prisoner of war ===
In March 1941, Bridgman was transferred for three months to Stalag XX-A before returning to Spangenberg. In October 1941 he was transferred to Oflag VI-B at Doessel, Warburg, then in September 1942, to Oflag XXI-B in Szubin, Poland. In November, 1942, he made an unsuccessful attempt to escape by tunneling with a comrade, and as recorded on his POW internment card was subsequently put under close confinement for ten days.

On April 11, 1943, Bridgman was moved to Stalag Luft III. His internment card portrays something of his character as the entry for his mother’s maiden name was given as Goring, a defiant misinformation referring to the famous World War I fighter pilot ace and prominent military leader Hermann Göring.

In October of that year he was a significant participant in the famous Wooden Horse escape plan in which a gymnastic vaulting horse, ostensibly to promote exercise for camp members, was used to conceal men and tools tasked with tunneling. The success of the plan resulted in three prisoners, Lieutenant Michael Codner, Flight Lieutenant Eric Williams and Flight Lieutenant Oliver Philpot escaping safely back to England. Eric Williams’ subsequent book of 1949, The Wooden Horse, was made into a 1950 film of the same name, directed by Jack Lee and starring Leo Genn, David Tomlinson and Anthony Steel.

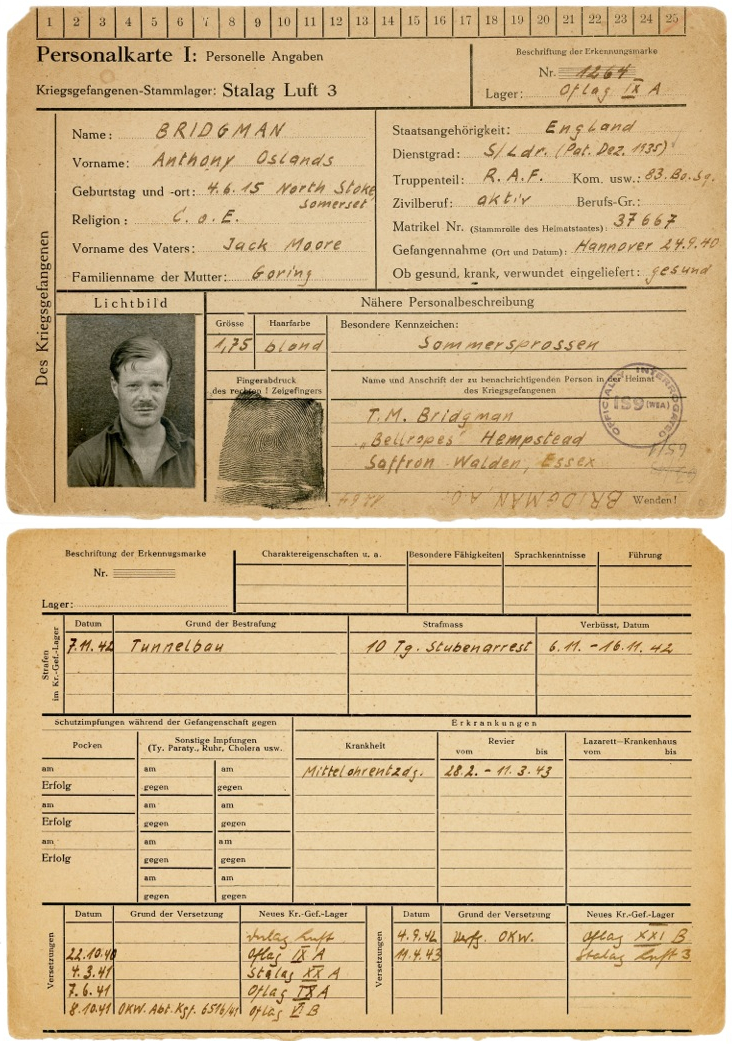
Stalag Luft III internment card of Anthony Orlando Bridgman, DFC.

His various transfers after Stalag Luft III were not recorded on his internment card, but eventually Bridgman was among the many who were liberated by the Russians, and delivered into the hands of the Americans whereupon he was flown to Brussels. As a British officer, he was requested to bring a list of all fellow POWs to allied headquarters in Paris. After several days in Paris, Bridgman returned to England by boat to Newhaven. Declining a post of commanding officer in the RAF, he was officially discharged from the service in 1946.

== Personal life ==
Married in 1950 to the American Jeannette Graef, Bridgman and his young family moved in 1956 to Vancouver where the marriage subsequently resulted in separation. Eventually returning to UK, Bridgman bought a small printing company in Guildford, Dramrite Printers Ltd., moving it to Long Lane in Bermondsey, London until it was sold in 1980. Bridgman then retired to the village of Polruan in Cornwall. He never remarried.

Bridgman died in Northam, Devon, on January 14, 2006, survived by three daughters, Judith, Frances and Kathleen, and five grandchildren. Of his original coterie of fellow officers in No. 83 Squadron in 1937, Bridgman was the last survivor; Leonard Snaith had died in 1985, John Collier in 2000, while Jamie Pitcairn Hill, Ellis Ross and Guy Gibson were lost in action during the war.
