= The Wooden Horse =

1950 film by Jack Lee

- DVD cover
- Directed by: Jack Lee
- Written by: Eric Williams
- Produced by: Ian Dalrymple
- Starring: Leo Genn; David Tomlinson; Anthony Steel
- Cinematography: C. M. Pennington-Richards
- Edited by: Peter Seabourne; John Seabourne
- Music by: Clifton Parker
- Production company: London Films
- Distributed by: British Lion Film Corporation
- Release date: 16 October 1950
- Running time: 101 minutes
- Country: United Kingdom
- Languages: English; German; French; Danish
- Box office: £266,545 (UK)

The Wooden Horse is a 1950 British World War II war film directed by Jack Lee and starring Leo Genn, David Tomlinson and Anthony Steel. It is based on the book of the same name by Eric Williams, who also wrote the screenplay.

The film depicts the true events of an escape attempt made by POWs in the German prison camp Stalag Luft III. The wooden horse in the title of the film is a piece of exercise equipment the prisoners use to conceal their escape attempt as well as a reference to the Trojan Horse which was also used to conceal men within.

The Wooden Horse was shot in a low-key style, with a limited budget and a cast including many amateur actors.

== Plot ==
Flight Lieutenant Peter Howard, Captain John Clinton and Philip Rowe are Allied prisoners in Stalag Luft III, a German prisoner of war camp in World War II. Plans to dig an escape tunnel are complicated by the layout of the camp. Their barracks huts, the only place a tunnel entrance might be concealed, are a considerable distance from the perimeter fence. To reduce the amount of digging needed, the prisoners come up with an ingenious way of shortening the tunnel. They decide to start the tunnel in the middle of an open area close to the perimeter fence and conceal the entrance with a vaulting horse constructed from plywood from Canadian Red Cross parcels.

Recruiting fellow prisoners to form a team of vaulters, they carry the horse out to the same spot every day, with a man hidden inside. The prisoners exercise using the vaulting horse while the concealed man digs underneath. At the end of the session the digger places wooden boards, cut to fit the aperture, in the hole and fills the space with sandbags and dry sand kept for the purpose since freshly dug sand would appear darker and give away the tunnel. As the tunnel lengthens, two men are hidden inside the horse while a larger group of men exercise and they recruit a third man, Phil, to assist them, with the promise that he will join the escape.

When the tunnel is complete, Clinton hides in the tunnel during a roll call and Howard and Phil are carried out in the horse with a third man to replace the tunnel trap and conceal the entrance again. The trio successfully escape and Howard and Clinton travel by train to the Baltic port of Lübeck. Phil elects to travel alone, posing as a Norwegian margarine salesman and travelling by train via Danzig.

On the docks Howard and Clinton are forced to kill a German sentry who surprises the hiding men; they contact French workers, through whom they meet "Sigmund", a Danish resistance worker who smuggles them onto a Danish ship. They then transfer to a fishing boat and arrive in Copenhagen before being shipped to neutral Sweden where they are reunited with Phil who arrived earlier.

== Cast ==
- Leo Genn as Peter Howard
- David Tomlinson as Philip Rowe
- Anthony Steel as John Clinton
- David Greene as Bennett
- Peter Burton as Nigel
- Patrick Waddington as the Senior British Officer
- Michael Goodliffe as Robbie
- Anthony Dawson as Pomfret
- Bryan Forbes as Paul
- Dan Cunningham as David
- Peter Finch as the Australian in hospital
- Philip Dale as Bill White
- Russell Waters as 'Wings' Cameron
- Ralph Ward as the Adjutant
- Helge Erickssen as Sigmund
- Lis Løwert as Kamma
- William Markus as a British soldier

== Production ==
The film was based on a book by Eric Williams, which had been published in 1949. The book was reissued in 1980.

Ian Dalrymple and Jack Lee read the book and bought the film rights. They out-bid John Mills who also wanted to make it. "I expect John would have been very good in it also," said Jack Lee "probably better than Leo Genn, who was very stolid as an actor."

Leo Genn played the Eric Williams character while Anthony Steele played a character based on Michael Codner. Codner was killed in 1952 in an ambush during the Malayan Emergency.

"We are not inventing anything," Lee said during filming. "It isn't necessary. The whole book is dynamite as a film script."

=== Shooting ===
Three-quarters of the film was shot in Germany. The Stalag was rebuilt in the British zone near where the Germans surrendered at Lüneburg Heath.

In the film the escapees go to Lübeck, not Stettin, which is what happened in real life. This was because the producers did not want to have to deal with the Russian Occupied Zone.

The film went over budget, for several reasons: the weather was poor and several scenes had to be done again. "A lot of it was my fault, taking too long to shoot and shooting too much stuff," said Lee. He added "there was indecision on my producer's part about the ending; Ian said we should shoot things in two different ways. The ultimate ending was a perfectly reasonable one but I was off the film by then. Ian shot it himself."

Filming was finished in Germany by January 1950, after which studio work was done in London.

At least two future film directors, Bryan Forbes and David Greene, were in the supporting cast.

The film was a breakthrough role for Anthony Steel. "Tony Steel was fine to work with – just a physical type, a young chap who could do certain things," said Lee. According to Filmink "he is clearly meant to be "the cute one" of the trio, spending a considerable amount of the film’s running time walking around in shorts bare-chested."

The actor Peter Butterworth, who had been a prisoner in Stalag Luft III during the Second World War and was one of the vaulters in the episode portrayed in the film, auditioned for a part in the film but the producers said he "didn't look convincingly heroic or athletic enough".

Producer Ian Dalrymple made the movie for Alexander Korda's British Lion after a long association with the Rank Organisation. According to J. Arthur Rank's biographer, the movie "provided a particularly interesting example of the way Korda could help his directors in a way that Rank was not capable of doing; Ian Dalrymple showed him a rough cut and asked his advice, and they worked out an idea for re-takes which gave the film considerably more warmth."

== Reception ==
=== Critical ===
Variety said "a commendable degree, of documentary fidelity has been established in this picturization of the escape of three prisoners of war from a German camp* The long and torturous period of preparation is faithfully recaptured. Inevitably, treatment rules out a fast-moving production, and although this won’t harm it as a boxoffice attraction at home, it may have a limiting appeal when it eventually reaches the US."

=== Box office ===
The film was the third most popular film at the British box office in 1950. According to Kinematograph Weekly the 'biggest winners' at the box office in 1950 Britain were The Blue Lamp, The Happiest Days of Your Life, Annie Get Your Gun, The Wooden Horse, Treasure Island and Odette, with "runners up" being Stage Fright, White Heat, They Were Not Divided, Trio, Morning Departure, Destination Moon, Sands of Iwo Jima, Little Women, The Forsythe Saga, Father of the Bride, Neptune's Daughter, The Dancing Years, The Red Light, Rogues of Sherwood Forest, Fancy Pants, Copper Canyon, State Secret, The Cure for Love, My Foolish Heart, Stromboli, Cheaper by the Dozen, Pinky, Three Came Home, Broken Arrow and Black Rose.

It led to a series of stories about POWs, including Albert R.N. (1953), The Colditz Story (1955), The One That Got Away (1957), The Camp on Blood Island (1958) and Danger Within (1959).

== Historical accuracy ==
The Wooden Horse plan itself was previously thought to be conceived and entirely thought through by Williams and Michael Codner in equal measures. In Oliver Philpot's later book, The Stolen Journey, the author made it clear that he initially thought the plan was "crackers", telling its inventors "I give it a couple of days!" Nevertheless Philpot helped with the sand dispersal and later with the actual digging – at which point he was invited to take part in the escape.

However it has been argued that Flt Lt Dominic Bruce (the 'Medium Sized man') and Squadron Leader Peter Tunstall were the original innovators of the wooden-horse-escape technique. Along with Eustace Newborn and Peter Tunstall, Bruce came up with the escape plan now known as "the Swiss Red Cross Commission" at his previous camp (Oflag IX-A/H) at Spangenberg Castle. Tunstall wrote that in 1941, prior to him and Bruce planning an escape with the famed 'Swiss Red Cross Commission', he and Bruce had been digging an escape route with a wooden horse tunnel from inside the gymnasium, the wooden horse being placed roughly four feet from the wall that separated the gym from the moat. The digging was a very slow process. It required the removal of spoil, bricks and stonework and was aided by other prisoners distracting the guards. They were later joined by Douglas 'Sammy' Hoare and a syndicate who were promised a second go if they escaped undiscovered. Other members of this syndicate were also named as Harry Bewlay, John Milner and Eustace Newborn.

When Bruce and Tunstall noted the slow process they began examining the rest of the castle and left the digging to the other team involving Sammy Hoare. The tunnel almost reached completion but unfortunately the digging team got caught when a guard become suspicious at the large stones that were accumulating outside the gym. The guard called a search and found the escape tunnel. When the guards found the shaft they held an Appell and Hauptmann Schmidt confidently stated to the prisoners, "It is impossible to escape by tunnel or any other way."

This wooden horse gym escape tunnel was two years prior to the famed Sagan wooden horse escape. Tunstall stated that he would like to think some of the watchers and workers who helped on their original wooden horse escape may have mentioned it from time to time and would like to think that their idea contributed to the success of the effort at Sagan.

== See also ==
- Dominic Bruce
