= Klim (powdered milk) =

Brand of powdered milk

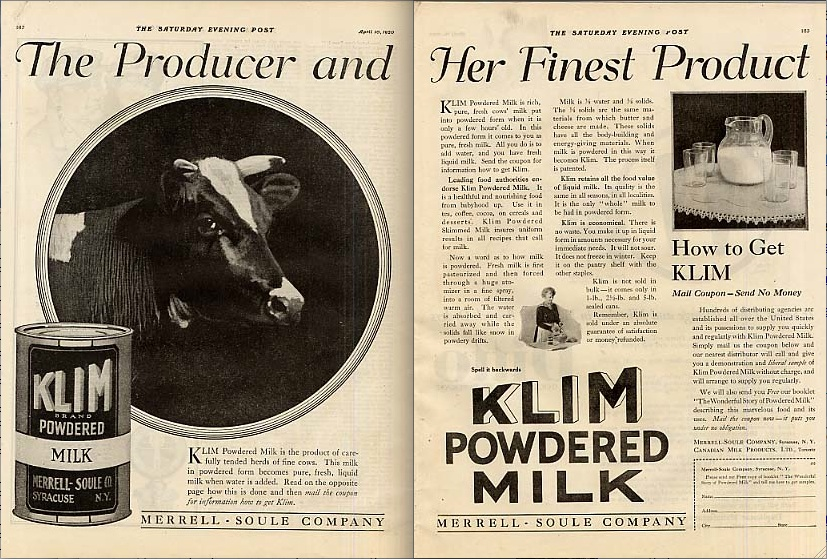
- Klim advertisement in 1920
- Product type: Food
- Current owner: Nestlé
- Country: United States
- Introduced: 1920
- Markets: Worldwide
- Tagline: "Spell it backwards"
- Website: nestle-caribbean.com

Klim (stylized as KLIM) is a brand of powdered milk owned by Nestlé, which acquired it in 1998 from Borden. Klim is sold worldwide. Early ads featured the slogan "Spell it backwards."

== History ==
Klim was developed as a dehydrated whole-milk powder for use in the tropics, where ordinary milk tended to spoil quickly. It soon became a staple of scientific explorers, geologists, soldiers, and other jungle travelers who needed a lightweight dry ration that would keep for several days in high heat and humidity, even when decanted from its container.

In 1920 Klim was a product of Merrell-Soule Company of Syracuse, New York which in 1907 had improved the spray-drying method patented by Robert Stauf in 1901 by starting with condensed milk instead of regular milk. In 1927 Borden acquired Merrell-Soule gaining the Klim brand and None Such Mincemeat, both already made popular worldwide.

During World War II, Klim was initially adopted as part of the U.S. Army Jungle ration. As one officer noted, "That quite dense milk powder kept safely for years if its stout can was unopened, and for at least a week in jungle heat if taken out and kept in a waterproof bag". Klim was later issued by the Red Cross to prisoners of war, particularly those held in German prison camps, in order to increase caloric intake.

According to British author J. G. Ballard, Klim was included in American relief supplies dropped over Shanghai, China, and the surrounding countryside following the Japanese surrender in August 1945. As a teenager, Ballard had been interned for two years and five months in the Lunghua Civilian Assembly Centre. The cans of powdered milk, along with tinned SPAM, chocolate bars, and cartons of Lucky Strike cigarettes, are mentioned in Ballard's novel, Empire of the Sun, and his autobiography, Miracles of Life.

Klim was also found in other theatres – for example in the Burma campaign, where troops retreating from the Japanese invasion found tins of Klim in deserted villages. These proved very useful and provided much needed sustenance.

Klim cans were approximately four inches in diameter and three inches deep. The metal in the cans could be fashioned into a variety of different tools and other useful items such as scoops and candle holders. Klim cans were instrumental in the escape attempt from Stalag Luft III. In the book Under The Wire, William Ash and Brendan Foley tell how World War II prisoners of war removed the bottoms from the tins and hooked them together to form airtight pipes to provide air while digging escape tunnels. Scavenged Klim cans were used in the construction of the extensive ventilation ducting in three tunnels that led out of the prison camp.

One former prisoner at Stalag Luft III, Charles Huppert, told how prisoners became expert at turning tin cans into tools. Huppert said, "We used Klim tins for everything that we made, because you could cut the ends out, and have a large piece of tin to work with. You can straighten that out flat, and make a ... join them together in a locked joint, such as this, and take your wooden mallet and hammer them down. Then you take your backside of a knife and bear down on that, with a lot of pressure on both sides of that crimp, so that the tin will not separate, in order to make the tools that are used in the tunnels: the digging tools, the funnels, and the lamps to give light."
