= Michael Codner =

British Army officer

Richard Michael Clinton Codner
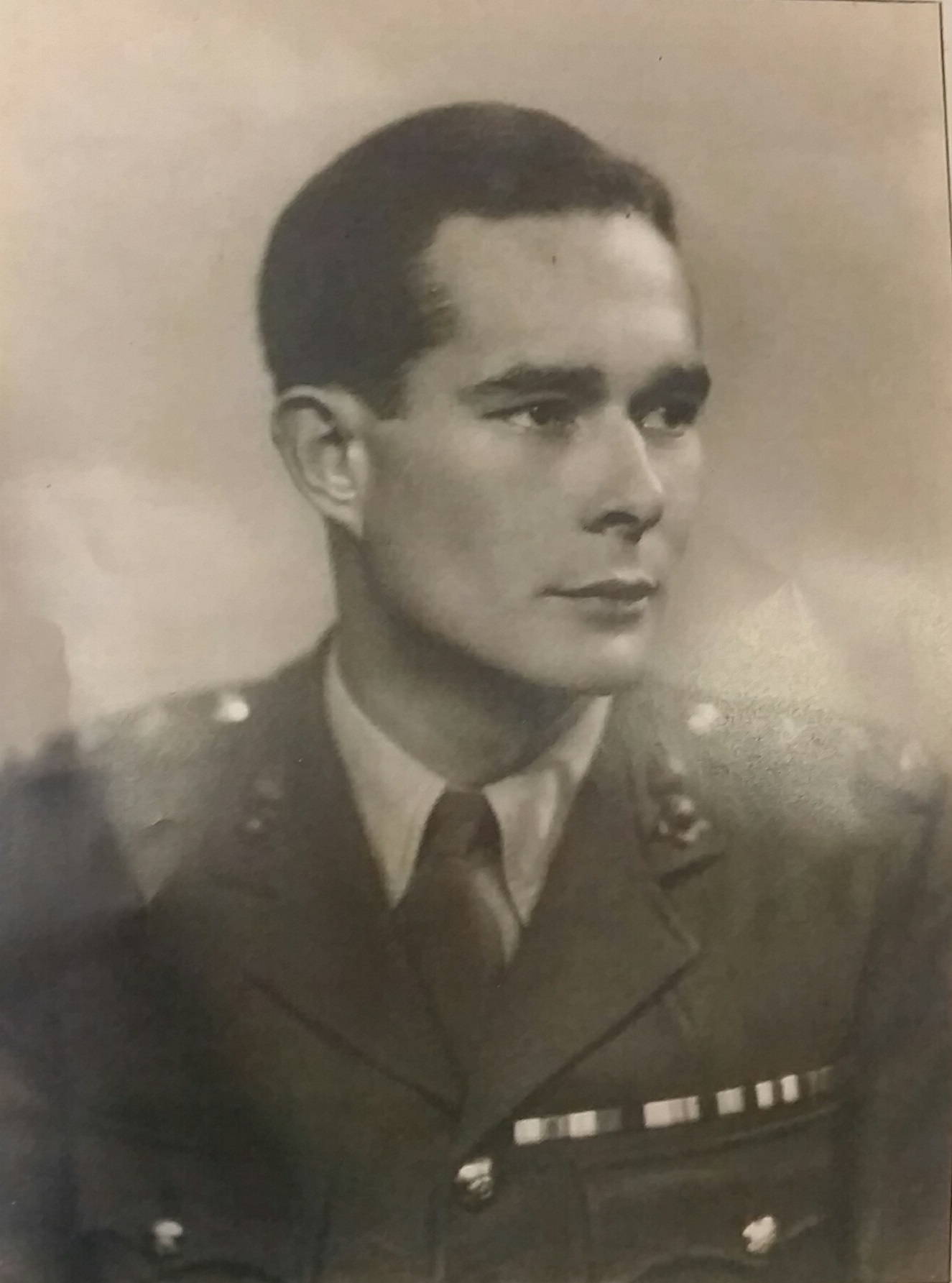
- Born: 29 September 1920; Malaya
- Died: 25 March 1952 (aged 31); Tanjung Malim, Malaya
- Burial place: Cheras Road Cemetery, Kuala Lumpur
- Military career
- Allegiance: United Kingdom
- Branch: British Army
- Rank: Captain
- Service number: 200507
- Unit: Royal Artillery
- Conflicts: Second World War
- Awards: MC

Captain Richard Michael Clinton Codner MC (29 September 1920 – 25 March 1952) was a British Second World War prisoner of war, best known for being one of the three men to escape successfully from Stalag Luft III in the escape known as The Wooden Horse.

In 1952 during the Malayan Emergency, Codner was killed by pro-independence guerrillas belonging to the Malayan National Liberation Army, the armed wing of the Malayan Communist Party. In response to Codner's killing, the British forces instituted draconian measures of collective punishment of nearby villagers in Tanjung Malim.

== Biography ==
Born in Malaya on 29 September 1920, Michael Codner was educated at Bedford School and Exeter College, Oxford. He was commissioned as a Second Lieutenant into the Royal Artillery on 2 August 1941, served in North Africa during the Second World War, and was captured on 14 December 1942 at Majaz al Bab in Tunisia. He was sent first to Rome, then to Dulag Luft in Frankfurt, which was a mistake, as the camp acted as collection and interrogation centre for newly captured aircrew, and then to Oflag XXI-B in Poland, where he became good friends with fellow prisoner Flight Lieutenant Eric Williams. Together they planned and executed an escape through a tunnel, which was later described by Williams in his book The Tunnel. However, they were quickly recaptured and sent to Stalag Luft III in Sagan in the east of Germany.

Stalag Luft III was designed to be a highly escape-resistant camp. Tunnelling in particular was made harder: the perimeter fence was placed some distance from the huts, necessitating longer tunnels; the soil changed colour markedly when dry, making disposal of freshly dug tunnel soil difficult; and the Germans employed seismographs to detect vibration caused by digging. Pondering the story of the Trojan Horse, Michael Codner developed the idea of employing a wooden vaulting horse in order to escape from Stalag Luft III. He approached Williams and they developed the idea together. They approached a third prisoner, Flight Lieutenant Oliver Philpot, in June 1943 to "register" their escape scheme with the escape committee, as Philpot was the escape co-ordinator for the hut in which the three of them lived. The scheme was approved and so, using bowls for shovels, Codner, Williams and Philpot dug for three months whilst the other camp inmates vaulted continuously over the wooden horse in order to mask the vibration from the tunnelling work. Sand was carried back inside the horse and dried in the attic of the camp canteen before being distributed in the compound.

On the evening of 29 October 1943, the three men made their escape. Travelling north, Williams and Codner reached Stettin where they stowed away on a ship to neutral Sweden. Philpot, posing as a Norwegian businessman, took a train to Danzig and stowed away on a ship to Stockholm. From Sweden, all three officers were repatriated to Britain. The three men were the only prisoners successfully to escape from Stalag Luft III's eastern compound.

Michael Codner returned to combat in the Royal Artillery in Italy and was subsequently posted to India where he served with his brother, Christopher John Codner, on the North West Frontier.

After the Second World War Michael Codner completed his degree at Oxford. In 1948 he married Florence Isobel Rosemary Moseley-Leigh. He joined the Colonial Service and became an Assistant District Officer in Malaya at the time of the Malayan Emergency.

== Death ==
During the Malayan Emergency, on 25 March 1952, Codner and eleven other men were ambushed while repairing a sabotaged water pipeline and were killed by communist guerrillas of the Malayan National Liberation Army at Tanjung Malim, Malaya. He was thirty-one years of age. Codner and his widow, Rosemary, who died in 1985, are survived by their son, Peter.

In response to his death, general Gerald Templer enforced a series of collective punishments against the nearby civilian population, including 22-hour curfews and enforced food rationing to stop the locals from feeding the communist guerrillas in the nearby jungles.

== Military Cross ==
Michael Codner was awarded the Military Cross on 27 April 1944. The recommendation for the award read:

"This officer was captured at Medjez-El-Bab on 14 Dec. 42.He was sent first to Rome and then, by mistake, to DULAG LUFT (FRANKFURT-am-MAIN). From there he went to OFLAG XXIB (Schubin) and then STALAG LUFT III (SAGAN). Escape from Sagan is exceedingly difficult: no one had got home direct from SAGAN or had succeeded in making a break from the East Compound, where Lt. CODNER was imprisoned, for over a year. Wire schemes are suicidal and orthodox tunnels are always found. The only method for escape from the East Compound was something entirely new. Lt. CODNER with F/Lt. Williams started such a scheme with F/Lt. Philpot as third participant. On 8 Jul 43 the three men began digging a tunnel. A hollow vaulting horse was constructed under which the digging went on. The diggers were carried out daily inside the horse, and the dirt summarily removed, whilst a squad of P/W did vaulting exercises under the nose of a nearby sentry. The tunnel was 95 to 100 feet long, and the exit was in the open about 15 feet outside the wire. On 29 Oct 43 the tunnel was complete and the three men escaped. For the rest of the journey Lt. CODNER and F/Lt. WILLIAMS were together. They were dressed in civilian clothing improvised in the camp. They went by train to FRANKFURT-an-der-ODER and then to STETTIN via KUSTRIN, arriving there on 30 Oct. On 1 Nov they entered the dock area, hoping to board a Swedish ship unaided, but this attempt proved unsuccessful. Contacts were made with Frenchman, but it was not until 6 Nov that they were put in touch with a Danish sailor who offered to help them. They were smuggled on board and hidden in the foc'sle of a Swedish ship. On 7 Nov the ship docked at COPENHAGEN. Lt. Codner and F/Lt. Williams were hidden by the sailor in a flat outside the town. On 10 Nov. having returned to the ship, they hid in the chain locker for a day and a night. On 11 Nov they were put ashore at STROMSTAD (SWEDEN). The next day they reached GOTEBORG and finally STOCKHOLM on 12 Nov 43. I recommend this officer for the award of the M.C."

== Film depiction ==
In the 1950 British film The Wooden Horse, Michael Codner is portrayed as the character John Clinton, played by Anthony Steel. The film is based on the book of the same name by Eric Williams, who also wrote the screenplay for the film.
