= Stalag Luft III =

World War II Luftwaffe-run prisoner of war camp

- German: Stammlager Luft
- Part of Luftwaffe
- Sagan, Lower Silesia, Nazi Germany (now Żagań, Poland)
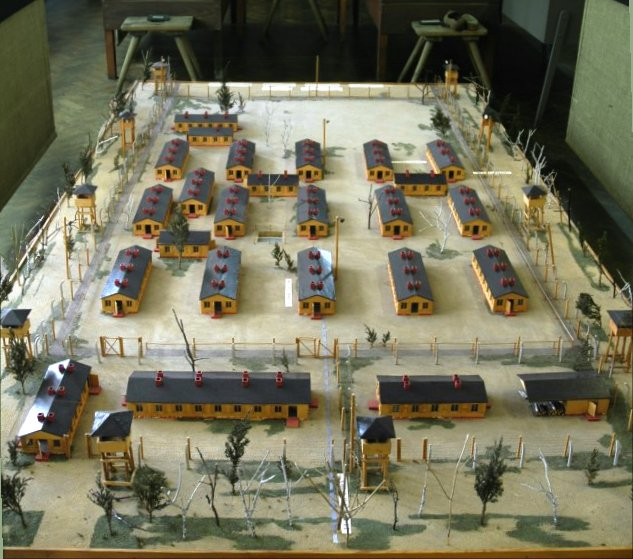
- Model of the set used during production of the 1963 film The Great Escape. It depicts a smaller version of a single compound in Stalag Luft III. The model is now at the museum near where the prison camp was located.

Site information
- Type: Prisoner-of-war camp
- Controlled by: Nazi Germany

Location
- Location within Poland Location within Germany
- Coordinates: 51.5986°N 15.3075°E

Site history
- In use: March 1942 – January 1945
- Battles/wars: World War II
- Events: The "Great Escape"

Garrison information
- Past commanders: Oberst Friedrich Wilhelm von Lindeiner-Wildau
- Occupants: Allied air crews, including Britons, Canadians, Poles, Americans, Australians, New Zealanders, Norwegians, Czechs, South Africans, Frenchmen, Dutchmen, Belgians, Greeks

Stalag Luft III (German: Stammlager Luft III; literally "Main Camp, Air, III"; SL III) was a Luftwaffe-run prisoner-of-war (POW) camp during the Second World War, which held captured Western Allied air force personnel.

The camp was established in March 1942 near the town of Sagan, Lower Silesia, in what was then Nazi Germany (now Żagań, Poland), 160 km (100 mi) south-east of Berlin. The site was selected because its sandy soil made it difficult for POWs to escape by tunnelling.

It is best known for two escape plots by Allied POWs. One was in 1943 and became the basis of a fictionalised film, The Wooden Horse (1950), based on the 1949 book of the same name by escapee Eric Williams. The second breakout—the so-called Great Escape—of March 1944, was conceived by Squadron Leader Roger Bushell of the Royal Air Force (RAF) and was authorised by the senior British officer at Stalag Luft III, Herbert Massey. A fictionalised version of the escape was depicted in the film The Great Escape (1963), which was based on 1950 book of the same name by former prisoner Paul Brickhill. The camp was liberated by Soviet forces in January 1945. The site of the former POW camp is now the 'Stalag Luft III Prisoner Camp Museum'.

== Camp life (1942–1944) ==
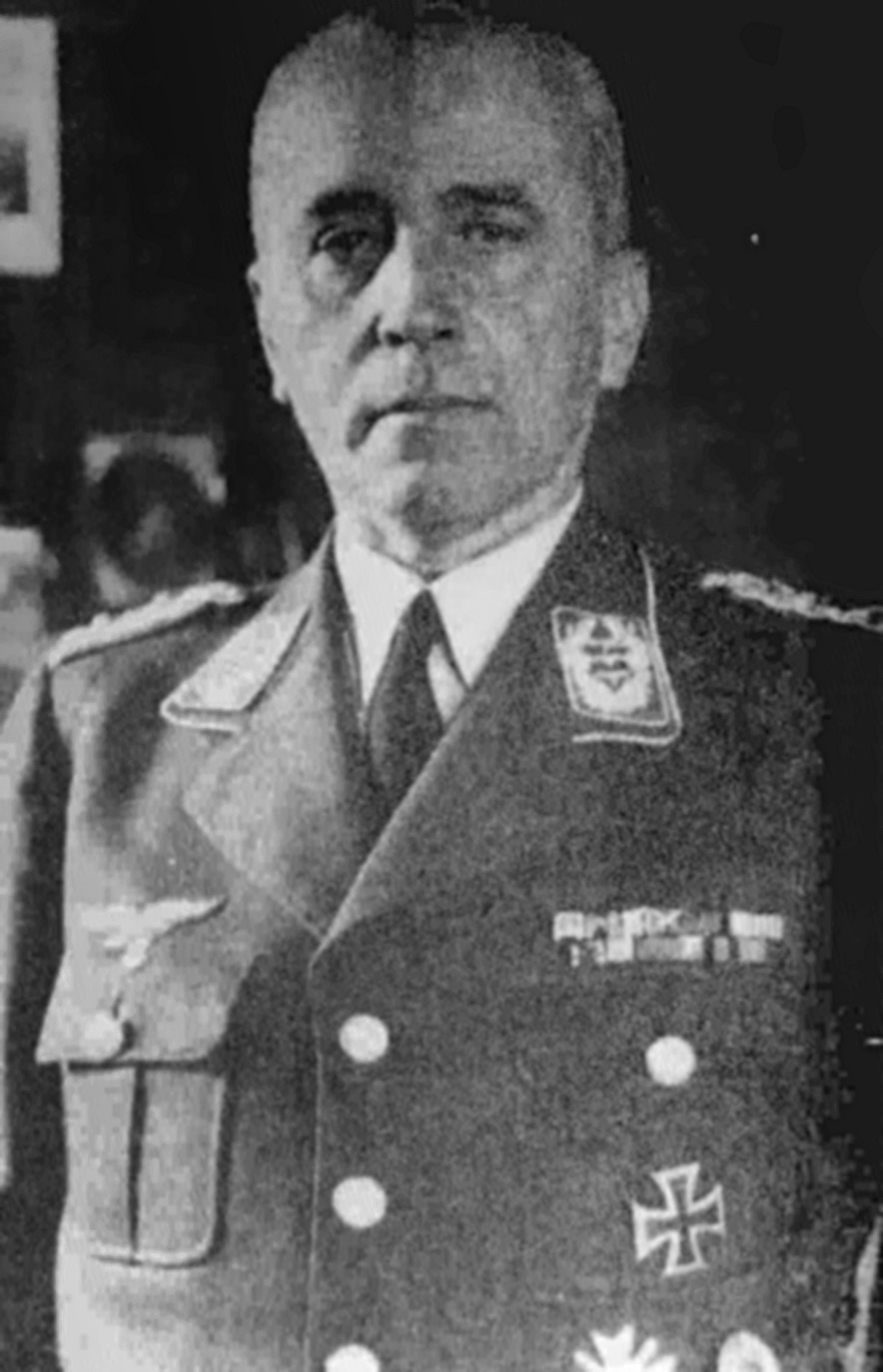
Friedrich Wilhelm von Lindeiner-Wildau, Kommandant of Stalag Luft III

The German military followed a practice whereby each branch of the military was responsible for the POWs of equivalent branches. Hence the Luftwaffe was normally responsible for any Allied aircrew taken prisoner. That included captured naval aviators, such as members of the British Fleet Air Arm. In a few cases, non-air force personnel were also held at Stalag Luft III.

Stammlager Luft (literally "Main Camp, Air") was Luftwaffe nomenclature for a POW camp. While the camp initially held only POWs who were officers, it was not known by the usual terms for such camps – Offizierslager or Oflag. Later camp expansions added compounds for non-commissioned officers (NCOs).

The first compound of the camp (East Compound) was completed and opened on 21 March 1942. The first POWs, or kriegies, as they called themselves (from Kriegsgefangene, German for "prisoner of war"), to be housed at Stalag Luft III were British and other Commonwealth officers, arriving in April 1942. The Centre Compound was opened on 11 April 1942 and originally held British and other Commonwealth NCOs. By the end of 1942, they were replaced by USAAF personnel. The North Compound for British airmen (where the "Great Escape" later occurred) opened on 29 March 1943. A South Compound for Americans was opened in September 1943. USAAF prisoners began arriving at the camp in significant numbers the following month and the West Compound was opened in July 1944 for US officers. Each compound consisted of fifteen single-story huts. Each 3.0 m × 3.7 m (10 ft × 12 ft) bunkroom slept fifteen men in five triple-deck bunks. Eventually the camp grew to approximately 24 ha (60 acres) in size and housed about 2,500 RAF officers, about 7,500 US Army Air Force officers and about 900 officers from other Allied air forces, for a total of 10,949 inmates, including some support officers.

The prison camp had a number of design features that made escape extremely difficult. The digging of escape tunnels, in particular, was made difficult by several factors, the barracks housing the prisoners were raised approximately 60 cm (24 in) off the ground to make it easier for guards to detect tunnelling; the camp had been constructed on land that had a very sandy subsoil; the surface soil was dark grey, so it could easily be detected if anyone dumped the brighter, yellow sand found beneath it above ground, or even just had some of it on their clothing. The loose, collapsible sand meant the structural integrity of any tunnel would be very poor. A third defence against tunnelling was the placement of seismograph microphones around the perimeter of the camp, which were expected to detect any sounds of digging.

A substantial library with schooling facilities was available, where many POWs studied for and took exams in subjects such as languages, engineering or law. The exams were supplied by the Red Cross and supervised by academics such as a Master of King's College who was a POW in Luft III. The prisoners also built a theatre and put on high-quality bi-weekly performances featuring all the current West End shows. The prisoners used the camp amplifier to broadcast a news and music radio station they named Station KRGY, short for Kriegsgefangener (POWs) and also published two newspapers, the Circuit and the Kriegie Times, which were issued four times a week.

POWs operated a system whereby newcomers to the camp were vetted, to prevent German agents from infiltrating them. Any POW who could not be vouched for by two POWs who knew the prisoner by sight was severely interrogated and afterwards escorted continually by other prisoners, until such time as he was deemed to be a genuine Allied POW. Several infiltrators were discovered by this method and none is known to have escaped detection in Luft III.

The German guards were referred to by POWs as "goons" and, unaware of the Allied connotation, willingly accepted the nickname after being told it stood for "German Officer Or Non-Com". German guards were followed everywhere they went by prisoners, who used an elaborate system of signals to warn others of their location. The guards' movements were then carefully recorded in a logbook kept by a rota of officers. Unable to stop what the prisoners called the "Duty Pilot" system, the Germans allowed it to continue and on one occasion the book was used by Kommandant Lindeiner to bring charges against two guards who had slunk away from duty several hours early.

The camp's 800 Luftwaffe guards were either too old for combat duty or young men convalescing after long tours of duty or from wounds. Because the guards were Luftwaffe personnel, the prisoners were accorded far better treatment than that granted to other POWs in Germany. Deputy Commandant Major Gustav Simoleit, a professor of history, geography and ethnology before the war, spoke several languages, including English, Russian, Polish and Czech. Transferred to Sagan in early 1943, he proved sympathetic to Allied airmen. Ignoring the ban against extending military courtesies to POWs, he provided full military honours for Luft III POW funerals, including one for a Jewish airman.

Food was always a matter of concern for the POWs. The recommended daily dietary intake for a normal healthy inactive adult male is 2,150 kcal (9,000 kJ). Luft III issued "non-working" German civilian rations which allowed 1,928 kcal (8,070 kJ) per day, with the balance made up from American, Canadian and British Red Cross parcels and items sent to the POWs by their families. As was customary at most camps, Red Cross and individual parcels were pooled and distributed to the men equally. The camp also had an official internal bartering system called a Foodacco – POWs marketed surplus goods for "points" that could be "spent" on other items. The Germans paid captured officers the equivalent of their pay in internal camp currency (Lagergeld), which was used to buy what goods were made available by the German administration. Every three months, weak beer was made available in the canteen for sale. As non-commissioned officers (NCOs) did not receive any "pay" it was the usual practice in camps for the officers to provide one-third for their use but at Luft III all Lagergeld was pooled for communal purchases. As British government policy was to deduct camp pay from the prisoners' military pay, the communal pool avoided the practice in other camps whereby American officers contributed to British canteen purchases.

Stalag Luft III had the best-organised recreational program of any POW camp in Germany. Each compound had athletic fields and volleyball courts. The prisoners participated in basketball, softball, boxing, touch football, volleyball, table tennis and fencing, with leagues organised for most. A 6.1 m × 6.7 m × 1.5 m (20 ft × 22 ft × 5 ft) pool used to store water for firefighting, was occasionally available for swimming.

As described by J. Frank Diggs, many amenities were made possible by Swedish lawyer Henry Söderberg, who was the YMCA representative to the area and frequently brought to its camps sports equipment, religious items supporting the work of chaplains, the wherewithal for each camp's band and orchestra and well-equipped library.

=== Stalag Luft III radio transmitter ===
Howard Cundall, a specialist observer from the Telecommunications Research Establishment with specialised knowledge of British radar built a radio transmitter with which he opened contact between the camp and London, maintaining the transmitter even during the final westward marches in 1945 as the Germans consolidated POW camps in the late stages of the war. In this way he provided information from captured air crews regarding their experiences with the German night defenses, helping the bombing offensive from within the camp.

=== US covert assistance to Stalag Luft III ===
Having been informed of the necessity and methods via similar British programmes, there were secret efforts to train American aircrews in secret letter writing home from the POW Camps. In the US, these were MIS-X and P.O. Box 1142 run out of Fort Hunt in Virginia, as well as a secret programme of sending escape aids into camps disguised inside care packages from two covert relief agencies. These went to American prisoners in many camps, including Stalag Luft III. The American POWs in Stalag Luft III were moved weeks prior to the 'Great Escape' attempt and were not able to participate.

=== Escape and evasion programme ===
Even more secret than the strategic interrogation programme was Fort Hunt's escape and evasion (E&E) program (MIS_X). Even the fort's commandant was unaware of this mission to prepare US servicemen to evade capture and, if captured, to escape, modelled on the British programme. One mission of the E&E programme was to create maps of areas where bombers were going so downed airmen could use them to find their way back. Silk maps created at P.O. Box 1142 were distributed to the Air Force, and five million uniform buttons were created containing hidden compasses. For five months prior to the escape of March 1944, MIS-X had been sending escape aids to the camp.

== First escape (1943) ==
The first escape occurred in October 1943 in the East Compound. Conjuring up a modern Trojan Horse, kriegies (prisoners) constructed a gymnastic vaulting horse largely from plywood from Red Cross parcels. The horse was designed to conceal men, tools and containers of soil. Each day the horse was carried out to the same spot near the perimeter fence and while prisoners conducted gymnastic exercises above, a tunnel was dug. At the end of each day, a wooden board was placed over the tunnel entrance and covered with surface soil. The gymnastics disguised the real purpose of the vaulting horse and kept the sound of the digging from being detected by the microphones. For three months Lieutenant Michael Codner, Flight Lieutenant Eric Williams and Flight Lieutenant Oliver Philpot, in shifts of one or two diggers at a time, dug over 30 m (100 ft) of tunnel, using bowls as shovels and metal rods to poke through the surface of the ground to create air holes. No shoring was used except near the entrance. On the evening of 29 October 1943, Codner, Williams and Philpot made their escape. Williams and Codner were able to reach the port of Stettin where they stowed away on a Danish ship and eventually returned to Britain. Philpot, posing as a Norwegian margarine manufacturer, was able to board a train to Danzig (now Gdańsk) and from there stowed away on a Swedish ship headed for Stockholm, from where he was repatriated to Britain. Accounts of this escape were recorded in the book Goon in the Block (later retitled The Wooden Horse) by Williams, the book Stolen Journey by Philpot and the 1950 film The Wooden Horse.

== The Great Escape (1944) ==
=== Background ===
In March 1943, Squadron Leader Roger Bushell conceived a plan for a mass escape from the North Compound, which took place on the night of 24/25 March 1944. He was being held with the other British and Commonwealth airmen and ran the Escape Committee that managed all escape opportunities from the north compound. Falling back on his legal background to represent his scheme, Bushell called a meeting of the Escape Committee to advocate his plan.

Everyone here in this room is living on borrowed time. By rights we should all be dead! The only reason that God allowed us this extra ration of life is so we can make life hell for the Hun [...] In North Compound we are concentrating our efforts on completing and escaping through one master tunnel. No private-enterprise tunnels allowed. Three bloody deep, bloody long tunnels will be dug – Tom, Dick and Harry. One will succeed!

Group Captain Herbert Massey, as senior British officer, authorised the escape attempt which would have good chance of success; in fact, the simultaneous digging of three tunnels would become an advantage if any one of them was discovered, because the guards would scarcely imagine that another two were well under way. The most radical aspect of the plan was not the scale of the construction, but the number of men intended to pass through the tunnels. While previous attempts had involved up to 20 men, in this case Bushell was proposing to get over 200 out, all wearing civilian clothes and some with forged papers and escape equipment. As this escape attempt was unprecedented in size, it would require unparalleled organisation. As the mastermind of the Great Escape, Roger Bushell inherited the codename of "Big X". More than 600 prisoners were involved in the construction of the tunnels.

=== Tunnels ===
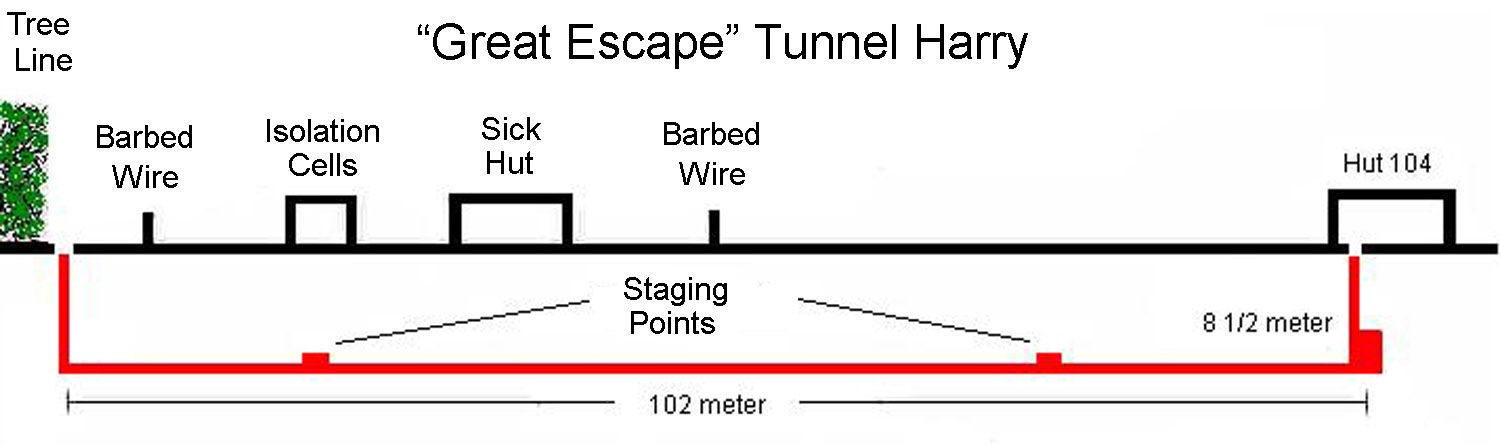

Three tunnels, Tom, Dick, and Harry, were dug for the escape. The operation was so secretive that everyone was to refer to each tunnel by its name. Bushell took this so seriously that he threatened to court-martial anyone who even uttered the word "tunnel". Tom began in a darkened corner next to a stove chimney in hut 123 and extended west into the forest. It was found by the Germans and dynamited. Dick's entrance was hidden in a drain sump in the wash room of hut 122 and had the most secure trap door. It was to go in the same direction as Tom and the prisoners decided that the hut would not be a suspected tunnel site as it was further from the wire than the others. Dick was abandoned for escape purposes because the area where it would have surfaced was cleared for camp expansion. Dick was used to store soil and supplies and as a workshop.

Harry, which began in hut 104, went under the Vorlager (which contained the German administration area), sick hut and the isolation cells to emerge at the woods on the northern edge of the camp. The entrance to Harry was hidden under a stove. Ultimately used for the escape, it was discovered as the escape was in progress with only 76 of the planned 220 prisoners free. The Germans filled it with sewage and sand and sealed it with cement. After the escape, the prisoners started digging another tunnel called George, but this was abandoned when the camp was evacuated.

=== Tunnel construction ===
The tunnels were very deep – about 9 m (30 ft) below the surface. They were very small, only 0.6 m (2 ft) square, though larger chambers were dug to house an air pump, a workshop and staging posts along each tunnel. The sandy walls were shored up with pieces of wood scavenged from all over the camp, much from the prisoners' beds (of the twenty or so boards originally supporting each mattress, only about eight were left on each bed). Other wooden furniture was also scavenged.

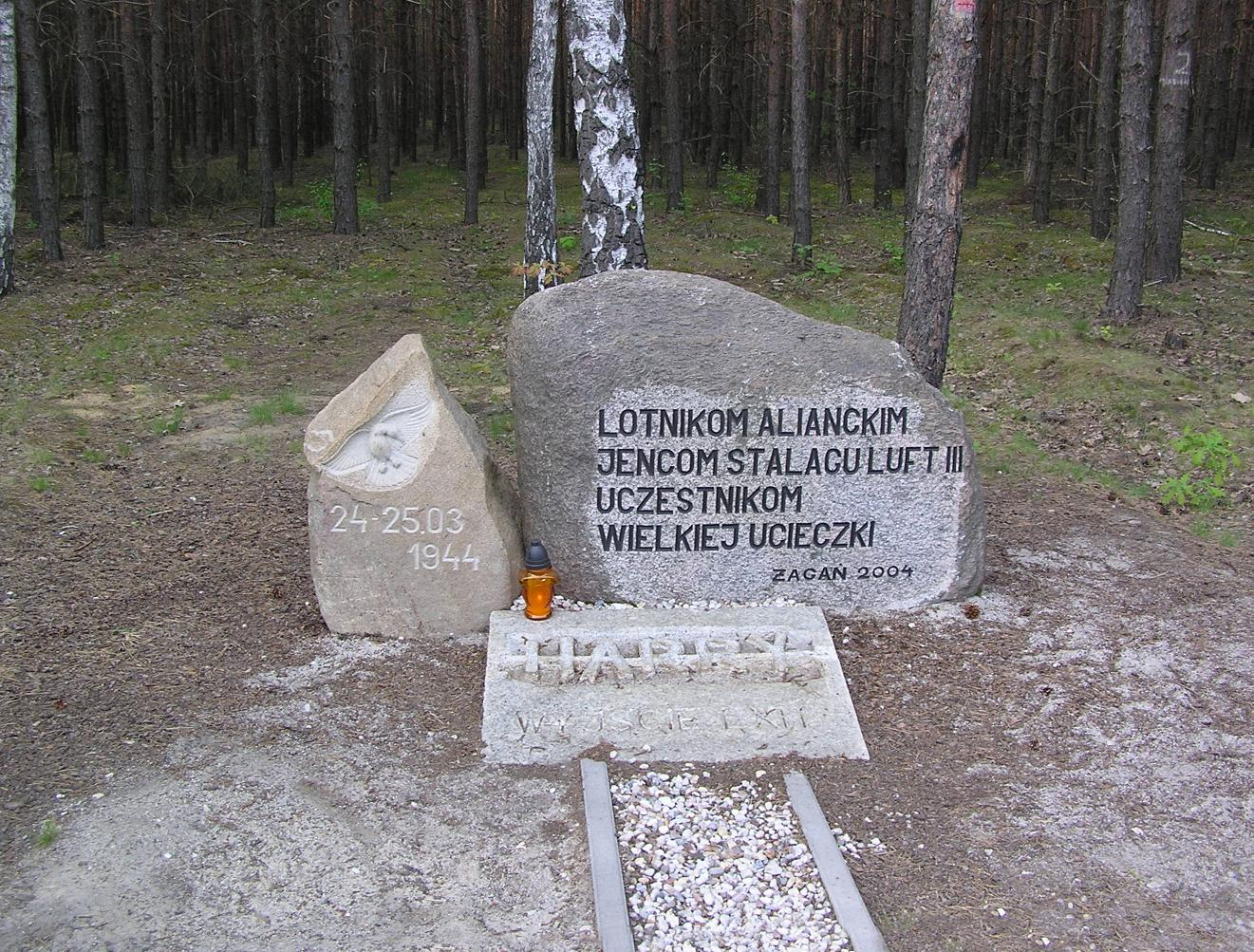
End of "Harry"

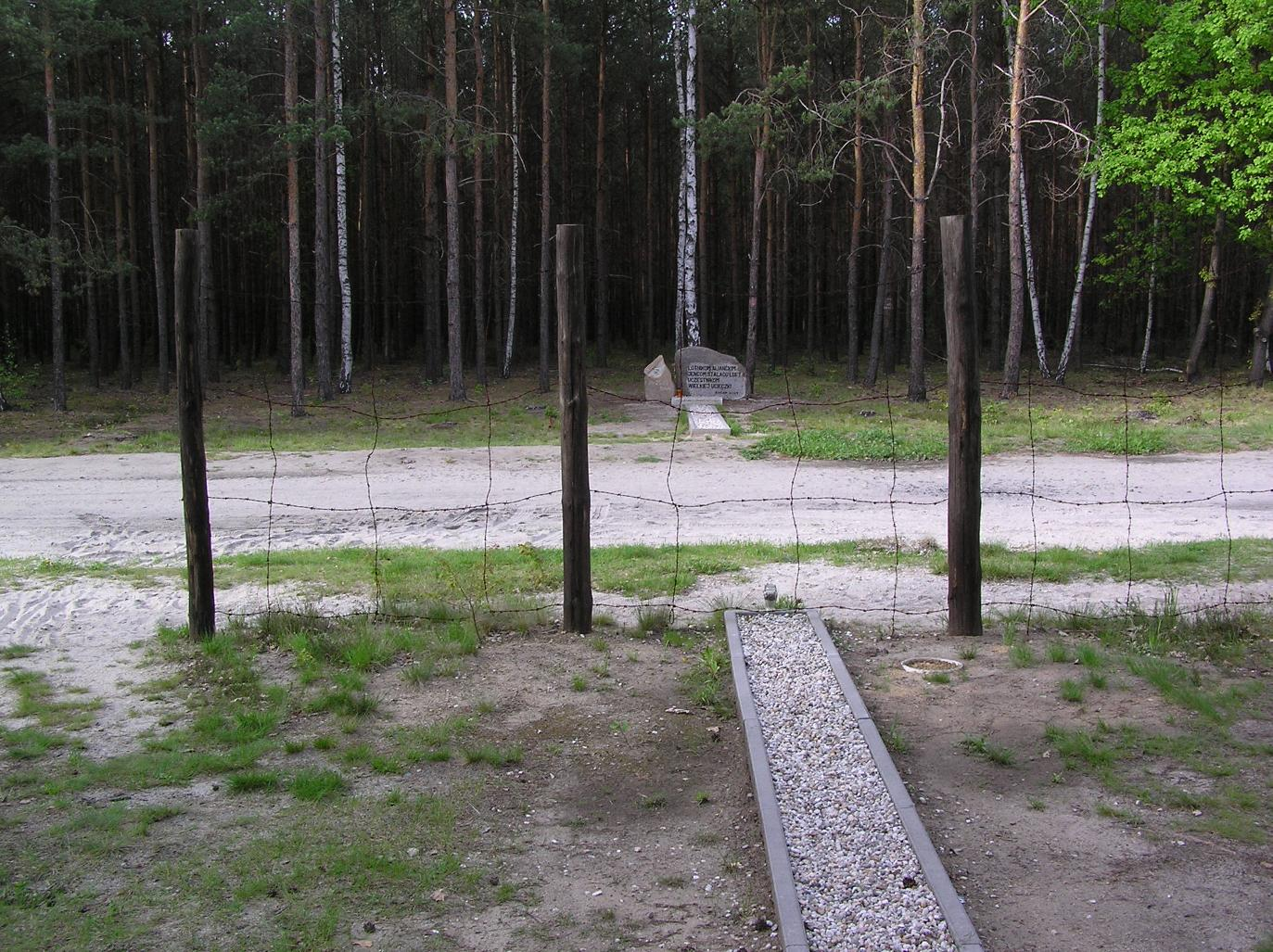
End of "Harry" tunnel showing how close the exit was to the camp fence

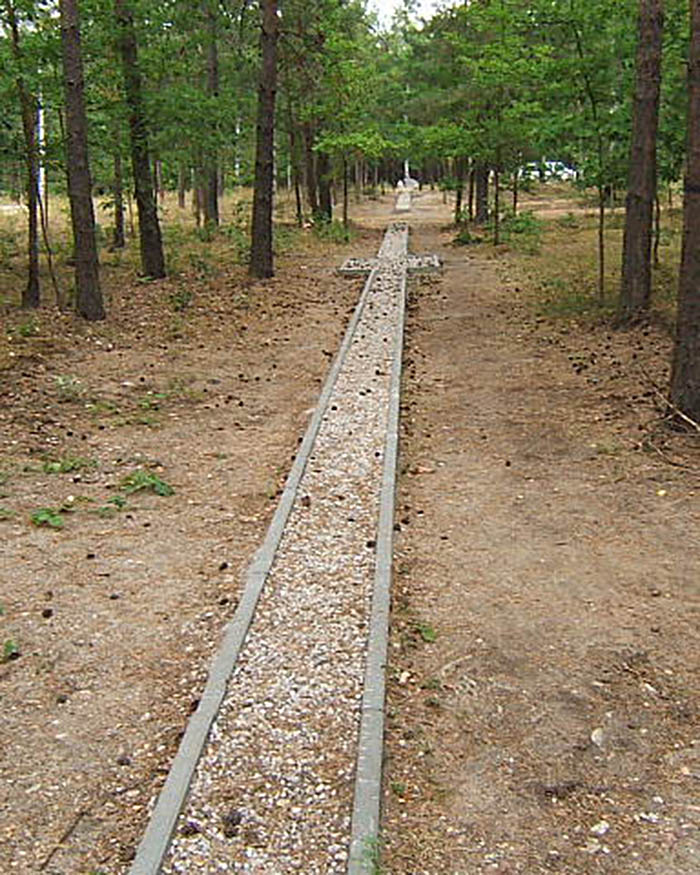
"Harry"

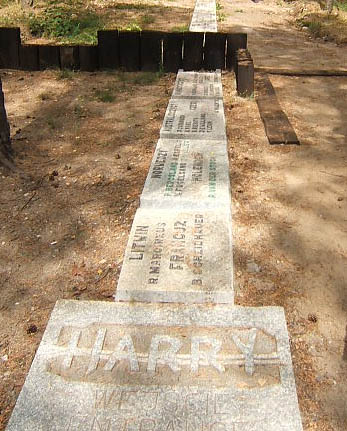
Entrance of "Harry" showing outline of building

Other materials were also used, such as Klim tin cans that had held powdered milk supplied by the Red Cross for the prisoners. The metal in the cans could be fashioned into various tools and items such as scoops and lamps, the latter fuelled by fat skimmed off soup served at the camp and collected in tiny tin vessels, with wicks made from worn clothing. The main use of the Klim tins was for the extensive ventilation ducting in all three tunnels.

As the tunnels grew longer, a number of technical innovations made the job easier and safer. A pump was built to push fresh air along the ducting, invented by Squadron Leader Bob Nelson of 37 Squadron. The pumps were built of odd items including pieces from the beds, hockey sticks and knapsacks, as well as the Klim tins.

The usual method of disposing of sand from all the digging was to scatter it discreetly on the surface. Small pouches made of towels or long underpants were attached inside the prisoners' trousers; as they walked around, the sand could be scattered. Sometimes, they would dump sand into the small gardens they were allowed to tend. As one prisoner turned the soil, another would release sand while they both appeared to be in conversation. The prisoners wore greatcoats to conceal the bulges from the sand, and were referred to as "penguins" because of their supposed resemblance. In sunny months, sand could be carried outside and scattered in blankets used for sun bathing; more than 200 were used to make an estimated 25,000 trips.

The Germans were aware that something was going on but failed to discover any of the tunnels until much later. To break up an escape attempt, nineteen of the top suspects were transferred without warning to Stalag VIIIC. Of those, only six had been involved with tunnel construction. One of these, a Canadian named Wally Floody, was actually originally in charge of digging and camouflage before his transfer.

Eventually the prisoners felt they could no longer dump sand above ground because the Germans became too efficient at catching them doing it. After Dick's planned exit point was covered by a new camp expansion, the decision was made to start filling it up. As the tunnel's entrance was very well hidden, Dick was also used as a storage room for items such as maps, postage stamps, forged travel permits, compasses, and clothing. Some guards cooperated by supplying railway timetables, maps and many official papers so that they could be forged. Some genuine civilian clothes were obtained by bribing German staff with cigarettes, coffee or chocolate. These were used by escaping prisoners to travel from the camp more easily, especially by train.

The prisoners ran out of places to hide sand, and snow cover made it impractical to scatter it undetected. Under the seats in the theatre there was a large empty space, but when it was built the prisoners had given their word not to misuse the materials; the parole system was regarded as inviolate. Internal "legal advice" was taken and the senior British officers ("SBOs") decided that the completed building did not fall under the parole system. A seat in the back row was hinged and the sand-dispersal problem was solved.

German prison camps began to receive larger numbers of American prisoners. The Germans decided that new camps would be built specifically for US airmen. To allow as many people to escape as possible, including the Americans, efforts on the remaining two tunnels increased. This drew attention from guards and in September 1943 the entrance to Tom became the 98th tunnel to be discovered in the camp; guards in the woods had seen sand being removed from the hut where it was located. Work on Harry ceased and did not resume until January 1944.

=== Tunnel "Harry" completed ===
"Harry" was finally ready in March 1944. By then the Americans, some of whom had worked on "Tom", had been moved away; despite the portrayal of three in the Hollywood film, only one American, Major Johnnie Dodge, participated in the "Great Escape", and he had become a British citizen. Previously, the attempt had been planned for the summer for its good weather, but in early 1944 the Gestapo visited the camp and ordered increased effort to detect escapes. Rather than risk waiting and having their tunnel discovered, Bushell ordered the attempt be made as soon as it was ready. Many Germans willingly helped in the escape itself. The film suggests that the forgers were able to make near-exact replicas of just about any pass that was used in Nazi Germany. In reality, the forgers received a great deal of assistance from Germans who lived many hundreds of miles away on the other side of the country. Several German guards, who were openly anti-Nazi, also willingly gave the prisoners items and assistance of any kind to aid their escape.

In their plan, of the 600 who had worked on the tunnels only 200 would be able to escape. The prisoners were separated into two groups. The first group of 100, called "serial offenders", were guaranteed a place and included 30 who spoke German well or had a history of escapes, and an additional 70 considered to have put in the most work on the tunnels. The second group, considered to have much less chance of success, was chosen by drawing lots; called "hard-arsers" because they would be travelling primarily by foot, they would have to travel by night as they spoke little or no German and were only equipped with the most basic fake papers and equipment.

The prisoners waited about a week for a moonless night, and on Friday 24 March, the escape attempt began. As night fell, those allocated a place moved to Hut 104. Unfortunately for the prisoners, the exit trap door of Harry was frozen solid and freeing it delayed the escape for an hour and a half. Then it was discovered that the tunnel had come up short of the nearby forest; at 10.30 p.m. the first man out emerged just short of the tree line close to a guard tower. (According to Alan Burgess, in his book The Longest Tunnel, the tunnel reached the forest, as planned, but the first few trees were too sparse to provide adequate cover). As the temperature was below freezing and there was snow on the ground, a dark trail would be created by crawling to cover. To avoid being seen by the sentries, the escapes were reduced to about ten per hour, rather than the one every minute that had been planned. Word was eventually sent back that no one issued with a number above 100 would be able to escape before daylight. As they would be shot if caught trying to return to their own barracks, these men changed back into their own uniforms and got some sleep. An air raid then caused the camp's (and the tunnel's) electric lighting to be shut down, slowing the escape even more. At around 1 a.m., the tunnel collapsed and had to be repaired.

Despite these problems, 76 men crawled through to freedom, until at 4:55 a.m. on 25 March, the 77th man was spotted emerging by one of the guards. Those already in the trees began running, while New Zealand Squadron Leader Leonard Henry Trent VC who had just reached the tree line stood up and surrendered. The guards had no idea where the tunnel entrance was, so they began searching the huts, giving men time to burn their fake papers. Hut 104 was one of the last to be searched, and despite using dogs the guards were unable to find the entrance. Finally, German guard Charlie Pilz crawled back through the tunnel but found himself trapped at the camp end; he began calling for help and the prisoners opened the entrance to let him out, finally revealing its location.

An early problem for the escapees was that most were unable to find the way into the railway station, until daylight revealed the entrance was in a recess of the side wall to an underground pedestrian tunnel. Consequently, many of them missed their night time trains, and decided either to walk across country or wait on the platform in daylight. Another unanticipated problem was that March 1944 was the coldest March in the region for thirty years, with snow up to five feet (1.5 m) deep, so the escapees had no option but to leave the cover of woods and fields and stay on the roads.

=== Murders of escapees ===
Nationalities of the 50 executed prisoners
(United Kingdom) twenty British
(Canada) six Canadian
(Poland) six Polish
(Australia) five Australian
(South Africa) three South African
(New Zealand) two New Zealander
(Norway) two Norwegian
(Argentina) one Argentinian (Note: John Gifford Stower, Pilot Officer, Royal Air Force Volunteer Reserve. He was born on 09-15-1916 in Jujuy, Argentina, and died on 03-31-1944 in Zagan, Poland (Germany at the time). He was part of No. 142 Squadron RAF when his Short Stirling bomber was shot down and was one of the 50 PoWs executed by the Gestapo under Hitler's direct orders on 31 March 1944. His name is on the Memorial to "The Fifty" down the road toward Żagań.)
(Belgium) one Belgian
(Czechoslovakia) one Czechoslovak
(France) one French
(Greece) one Greek
(Lithuania) one Lithuanian

Of 76 escapees, 73 were recaptured. Adolf Hitler initially wanted every recaptured officer to be shot. Hermann Göring, Field Marshal Wilhelm Keitel, Major-General Westhoff and Major-General Hans von Graevenitz (inspector in charge of war prisoners) pointed out to Hitler that a massacre might bring about reprisals to German pilots in Allied hands. Hitler agreed, but insisted "more than half" were to be shot, eventually ordering SS head Heinrich Himmler to execute more than half of the escapees. Himmler passed the selection on to General Arthur Nebe, and fifty were executed singly or in pairs. Roger Bushell, the leader of the escape, was shot by Gestapo official Emil Schulz just outside what is today Ramstein Air Base near Kaiserslautern, Germany. Bob Nelson is said to have been spared by the Gestapo because they may have believed he was related to his namesake Admiral Nelson. His friend Dick Churchill was probably spared because of his surname, shared with the British Prime Minister.

Seventeen captured escapees were returned to Stalag Luft III.

Two captured escapees were sent to Oflag IV-C at Colditz Castle, and four (Harry Day, Sydney Dowse, Bertram James, and Johnnie Dodge) were sent to Sachsenhausen concentration camp, where one quipped "the only way out of here is up the chimney." They managed to tunnel out and escape three months later, although they were recaptured and returned;

There were three successful escapees:

- Per Bergsland, Norwegian pilot of No. 332 Squadron RAF, escapee #44
- Jens Müller, Norwegian pilot of No. 331 Squadron RAF, escapee #43
- Bram van der Stok, Dutch pilot of No. 41 Squadron RAF, escapee #18

Bergsland and Müller escaped together, and reached neutral Sweden by train and boat with the help of friendly Swedish sailors. Van der Stok, granted one of the first slots by the Escape Committee owing to his language and escape skills, travelled through much of occupied Europe with the help of the French Resistance before finding safety at a British consulate in Spain.

=== Aftermath ===
Memorial to "The Fifty" down the road toward Żagań.

Following the escape, the Germans made an inventory of the camp and uncovered how extensive the operation had been. Four thousand bed boards had gone missing, as well as 90 complete double bunk beds, 635 mattresses, 192 bed covers, 161 pillow cases, 52 twenty-man tables, 10 single tables, 34 chairs, 76 benches, 1,212 bed bolsters, 1,370 beading battens, 1,219 knives, 478 spoons, 582 forks, 69 lamps, 246 water cans, 30 shovels, 300 m (1,000 ft) of electric wire, 180 m (600 ft) of rope, and 3,424 towels. 1,700 blankets had been used, along with more than 1,400 Klim cans. Electric cable had been stolen after being left unattended by German workers; because they had not reported the theft, they were executed by the Gestapo. Thereafter each bed was supplied with only nine bed boards, which were counted regularly by the guards.

The Gestapo investigated the escape and, while this uncovered no significant new information, the camp commandant, Friedrich Wilhelm von Lindeiner-Wildau, was removed and threatened with court martial. Having feigned mental illness to avoid imprisonment, he was later wounded by Soviet troops advancing toward Berlin while acting as second in command of an infantry unit. He surrendered to British forces as the war ended, and was a prisoner of war for two years at the prisoner of war camp known as the "London Cage". He testified during the British Special Investigation Branch (SIB) investigation concerning the Stalag Luft III murders. Originally one of Göring's personal staff, after being refused retirement, Lindeiner had been posted as Sagan commandant. He had followed the Geneva Accords concerning the treatment of POWs and had won the respect of the senior prisoners. He was repatriated in 1947 and died in 1963 aged 82.

On 6 April 1944, the new camp commandant Oberstleutnant Erich Cordes informed Massey that he had received official communication from the German High Command that 41 of the escapees had been shot while resisting arrest. Massey was himself repatriated on health grounds a few days later.

Over subsequent days, prisoners collated the names of 47 prisoners they considered to be unaccounted for. On 15 April (17 April in some sources. The Red Cross paid a visit to the camp on 22 May 1944. The previous visit had taken place on 26 July 1943) the new senior British officer, Group Captain Douglas Wilson (RAAF), surreptitiously passed a list of these names to an official visitor from the Swiss Red Cross.

Cordes was replaced soon afterwards by Oberst Werner Braune. Braune was appalled that so many escapees had been killed, and allowed the prisoners who remained there to build a memorial, to which he also contributed—the memorial still stands at its original site.

The British government learned of the deaths from a routine visit to the camp by Swiss authorities as the protecting power in May. The Foreign Secretary Anthony Eden announced the news to the House of Commons on 19 May 1944. Shortly afterwards, the repatriated Massey arrived in Britain and briefed the government regarding the fate of the escapees. Eden updated Parliament on 23 June, promising that, at the end of the war, those responsible would be brought to exemplary justice.

=== Postwar investigation and prosecutions ===
General Arthur Nebe, who is believed to have selected the airmen to be shot, was involved in the 20 July plot to kill Hitler and was executed by Nazi authorities in 1945.

After the war ended, Wg Cdr. Wilfred Bowes of the RAF Police Special Investigation Branch (SIB) began to research the Great Escape and launched a manhunt for German personnel considered responsible for killing escapees. As a result, several former Gestapo and military personnel were convicted of war crimes.

Colonel Telford Taylor was the US prosecutor in the German High Command case at the Nuremberg Trials. The indictment called for the General Staff of the Army and the High Command of the German Armed Forces to be considered criminal organisations; the witnesses were several of the surviving German field marshals and their staff officers. One of the crimes charged was of the murder of the fifty. Colonel of the Luftwaffe Bernd von Brauchitsch, who served on the staff of Reich Marshal Hermann Göring, was interrogated by Captain Horace Hahn about the murders. Several Gestapo officers responsible for the murders were executed or imprisoned.

In 1964, the West German government agreed to provide a million pounds as compensation to British victims of Nazism, which included survivors of the escape from Stalag Luft III. However, many former British POWs, including many of those who had been imprisoned at Stalag Luft III, had their claims rejected, leading to the political controversy known as the "Sachsenhausen Affair" in 1967.

=== Survivors ===
- Squadron Leader BA "Jimmy" James MC, RAF was shot down over the Netherlands on 5 June 1940, and subsequently was involved in 13 escape efforts from various camps and prisons, including the 'Great Escape' and the subsequent escape from Sachsenhausen concentration camp. He wrote an account of these escapes and his role in the building of the tunnels in his 1983 book Moonless Night. He was in charge of tunnel dispersal in the theatre. He died on 18 January 2008 aged 92.
- Flight Lieutenant Bernard "Pop" Green, RAF was one of the escapees who was captured by the Germans and sent back to Stalag Luft III. He survived the war and returned home to Buckinghamshire. He died November 2, 1971. Green was the oldest person to be involved in the escape, 56 years old and born in 1887. His grandson Lawrence Green wrote a book about him in 2012 entitled Great War to Great Escape: The Two Wars of Flight Lieutenant Bernard 'Pop' Green MC.
- Flight Lieutenant Tony Bethell was an RAF officer who was shot down and captured in the Netherlands on 7 December 1942. He was taken to Stalag Luft III and, aged 21, was the youngest man to escape through 'Harry' tunnel on 24 March 1944. He was captured on 28 March and interrogated by the Gestapo before being returned to Stalag Luft III, where he spent his 22nd birthday (9 April 1944) in the cooler. He died at his home in Canada in 2004. In honour of her husband, Lorna Bethell donated $2,000,000 and organised fundraising that resulted in the opening of Bethell Hospice in 2010.
- Jack Harrison, who was one of the 200 men of the Great Escape, died on 4 June 2010, at the age of 97.
- Les Broderick, who kept watch over the entry of the "Dick" tunnel, died on 8 April 2013 aged 91. He was in a group of three who had escaped out of the "Harry" tunnel but were recaptured when a cottage they had hoped to rest in turned out to be full of soldiers.
- Ken Rees, a digger, was in the tunnel when the escape was discovered. He later lived in North Wales and died at age 93 on 30 August 2014. His book is called Lie in the Dark and Listen.
- Flying Officer Gordon King of Edmonton, Alberta, Canada, had been number 141 to escape and operated the pump to send air into the tunnel. Speaking candidly of his high number and resulting inability to get out of the tunnel that night, he said he considered himself fortunate. King had been shot down over Germany in 1943 and spent the rest of the war as a prisoner. He participated in the Battle Scars television series in his home town of Edmonton. He died on 16 July 2020, at the age of 100.
- Jack Lyon, number 79 on the roster, celebrated his 100th birthday in 2017. He died on 12 March 2019, aged 101.
- Paul Royle, a Bristol Blenheim pilot, was interviewed in March 2014 as part of the 70th anniversary of the escape, living in Perth, Australia at the age of 100. He downplayed the significance of the escape and did not claim that he did anything extraordinary, saying: "While we all hoped for the future we were lucky to get the future. We eventually defeated the Germans and that was that." Royle died, aged 101, in August 2015.
- Dick Churchill was the last surviving of the 76 escapees before his death on 15 February 2019 aged 99; then an RAF squadron leader, he was among the 23 not executed by the Nazis. Churchill, a Handley Page Hampden bomber pilot, was discovered after the escape hiding in a hay loft. In a 2014 interview at the age of 94, he said he was fairly certain that he had been spared execution because his captors thought he might be related to British Prime Minister Winston Churchill.
- Charles Clarke was an RAF officer who served as a bomb aimer. After his Lancaster bomber crashed, he was captured and sent to Stalag Luft III, arriving weeks before the Great Escape. He did not take part in the escape itself, but had helped to forge papers and acted as a "watcher". He later took part in the forced march before being liberated. He remained in the RAF after the war, reaching the rank of air commodore. He returned to the camp in later life and helped build a replica of Hut 104 (where the Great Escape tunnel started). He also retraced the forced march on each anniversary. He died on 7 May 2019.

== Liberation in 1945 ==
Just before midnight on 27 January 1945, with Soviet troops only 26 km (16 mi) away, the remaining 11,000 POWs were marched out of camp with the eventual destination of Spremberg. In freezing temperatures and 15 cm (6 in) of snow, 2,000 prisoners were assigned to clear the road ahead of the main group. After a 55 km (34 mi) march, the POWs arrived in Bad Muskau where they rested for 30 hours, before marching the remaining 26 km (16 mi) to Spremberg. On 31 January, the South Compound prisoners plus 200 men from the West Compound were sent by train to Stalag VII-A at Moosburg followed by the Centre compound prisoners on 7 February. Thirty-two prisoners escaped during the march to Moosburg but all were recaptured. The North, East and remaining West compound prisoners at Spremberg were sent either to Stalag XIII-D at Nuremberg on 2 February or to Marlag und Milag Nord at Westertimke.

With the approach of US forces on 13 April, the American prisoners at XIII-D were marched to Stalag VII-A. While the majority reached VII-A on 20 April, many had dropped out on the way with the German guards making no attempt to stop them. Built to hold 14,000 POWs, Stalag VII-A now held 130,000 from evacuated stalags with 500 living in barracks built for 200. Some chose to live in tents while others slept in air raid slit trenches. The US 14th Armored Division liberated the prisoners of VII-A on 29 April. Kenneth W. Simmons's book Kriegie (1960) vividly describes the life of POWs in the American section of Stalag Luft III in the final months of the war, ending with the winter forced-march from the camp, ahead of the advancing Soviet troops and eventually being liberated.

== Notable prisoners ==
Notable military personnel held at Stalag Luft III included:

- Fighter pilot Roland Beamont, later to fly the English Electric Canberra and English Electric Lightning as a test pilot, arrived at Stalag Luft III just after the "Great Escape", having been shot down in his Hawker Tempest by ground fire, while attacking a troop train near Bocholt while on his 492nd operational sortie.
- Australian journalist Paul Brickhill was an inmate at Stalag Luft III from 1943 until release. In 1950 he wrote The Great Escape, the first comprehensive account of the breakout, which was later adapted into the film; and went on to chronicle the life of Douglas Bader in Reach for the Sky and the efforts of 617 "Dam Busters" Squadron.
- Josef Bryks, Czechoslovak RAFVR fighter pilot and serial escaper, was held at Stalag Luft III from August 1943 to July 1944.
- Col Darr Alkire, Commander of the 449th Bombardment Group. The senior officer in charge of the West Compound from April 1944 to release in April 1945. Future Brigadier General and Silver Star recipient.
- Flying Officer Ray Grayston, RAF, one of the "Dam Busters" who had bombed the Eder Dam, was an inmate at Stalag Luft III from 1943 to 1945.
- Flight Lieutenant George Harsh of the Royal Canadian Air Force (RCAF) was a member of the Great Escape's executive committee and the camp "security officer". He was one of the 19 "suspects" transferred to Belaria compound shortly before the escape. Born in 1910 to a wealthy and prominent family in the US state of Georgia, Harsh, a medical student, was sentenced to life imprisonment in 1929 for the self-confessed thrill killing of a grocer. He saved the life of a fellow prisoner by performing an emergency appendectomy, for which Georgia governor Eugene Talmadge released him on parole in November 1940 and finally granted him a full pardon. He then joined the RCAF as a tail gunner and after being shot down in 1942 was sent to Stalag Luft III. In 1971 he published his autobiography which has since been translated into German and Russian.
- George J. Iles, US Army Air Forces officer and fighter pilot with the 332nd Fighter Group's 99th Fighter Squadron (the Tuskegee Airmen or "Red Tails) Transferred to Nuremberg-Langwasser, and finally to the 86-acre, multinational prisoner of war camp, Stalag VII-A, the largest POW camp in Nazi Germany.
- Lt Alexander Jefferson of the 332nd Fighter Group, the "Red Tails" of the Tuskegee Airmen based out of Ramitelli Airfield near Foggia, Italy. During his 19th mission over Toulon, southern France on 12 August 1944, while attacking a radar installation he was shot down. Parachuting to safety and landing within a forest, he was immediately captured by Nazi ground troops, and was interred at Stalag Luft III after the Great Escape. He was later transferred to Stalag VII-A, just outside Dachau. After the Russian Army entered Poland, the prisoners were marched to Munich by the Germans, where they were freed by General George Patton's US Third Army.
- David M. Jones, Commander of the 319th Bombardment Group in North Africa, was an inmate at Stalag Luft III for two and a half years. According to his biography he led the digging team on Harry. In early 1942 Jones took part in the Doolittle Raid on Japan undertaken in retaliation for the December 1941 attack on Pearl Harbor.
- Squadron Leader Phil Lamason of the Royal New Zealand Air Force, who was also the senior officer in charge of 168 Allied airmen initially held at Buchenwald concentration camp.
- Fl Sgt Nathan 'Nat' Leaman, an MiD escaper, attempted escape from Stalag Luft III, and was later transferred to Heydekrug. It is believed the "scrounger" character in the film played by James Garner is based on Leaman. See article by Martin Sugarman of AJEX, on Jewish Virtual Library and JHSE web page under research articles.
- Squadron Leader Geoffrey Douglas Leyland, great-grandson of British shipping magnate Frederick Richards Leyland, was shot down over and captured in Holland in June 1942. He spent the remainder of the war in Stalag Luft III vetting incoming POWs.
- Major P. P. Kumaramangalam of the British Indian Army, a future Chief of the Indian Army.
- Flight Lieutenant Gordon "Moose" Miller RCAF, helped carry the Wooden Horse in and out each day under the German guns without faltering with the weight of two concealed diggers and a day's worth of earth. He was awarded the Distinguished Flying Cross for repairing a damaged Vickers Wellington in flight and allowing the crew to parachute to safety.
- Robert M. Polich Sr., also of the United States Army Air Forces, who received the Distinguished Flying Cross; later featured in the short film Red Leader on Fire which was submitted for the Minnesota's Greatest Generation short film festival in 2008.
- Col Delmar T. Spivey, who was, for a time, the senior American officer ("SAO"), was captured on 12 August 1943, while flying as an observer on a Boeing B-17 Flying Fortress of the 407th Bomb Squadron, 92d Bomb Group. As the USAAF expert on aerial gunnery, Spivey was on the mission to evaluate possible improvements to gun turrets. Spivey assumed command as SAO, in Centre Compound, in August 1943. Amazed by the prisoners' ingenuity, he had a carefully coded history of the camp created, so that future POWs would not have to "reinvent the wheel". This carefully hidden record was retrieved and carried at no little risk when the camp was hastily evacuated in late January 1945 as the Germans marched the prisoners away from the rapidly advancing Soviet armies. The documents served as the basis and initial impetus for Stalag Luft III – The Secret Story, a definitive history of the camp, by Col Arthur A. Durand, USAF (Ret.).
- Wing Commander Robert Stanford Tuck, a British flying ace with 29 victories, was imprisoned at Sagan until shortly before the Great Escape; suspected of being a ringleader, he was transferred to Belaria, which Tuck credited with saving his life. (His mentor, Roger Bushell, was among those shot after the Great Escape.) Tuck eventually managed to escape on 1 February 1945, during the evacuation of the camp, with the help of Polish RAF pilot Zbigniew Kustrzyński. Both made it to the Soviet lines.
- Flight Lieutenant Wally Floody, a Canadian shot down flying his Supermarine Spitfire aircraft, was also imprisoned at Sagan until shortly before the Great Escape; he was one of the 19 transferred to Belaria. Floody had been put in charge of digging and camouflage by Roger Bushell. At the end of the war Floody gave evidence about conditions in POW camps at the Nuremberg trials. In early 1962, Floody received a phone call from film director John Sturges. Floody was told about a film Sturges was planning to make based on the book by Paul Brickhill, an Australian flyer who spent time at Stalag Luft III. Floody agreed to be technical adviser on the 1963 feature film The Great Escape. He is popularly considered the real-life counterpart to that film's fictional "tunnel king", Danny Velinski, played by Charles Bronson. After returning to civilian life, Floody became a businessman and co-founder of the Royal Canadian Air Force Prisoners of War Association. He died in Toronto, Ontario on 25 September 1989.
- Brigadier-General Arthur W. Vanaman, the highest-ranking USAAF officer captured in the European Theatre of Operations. Vanaman, an intelligence officer, succeeded Spivey as SAO in mid-1944. He, like Spivey, had been captured after flying as an observer on a bombing mission. The crew had advised Vanaman to bail out after his aircraft had been hit by flak and filled with smoke. This, ironically, had been caused by the ignition of a harmless smoke marker and the bomber had returned to base safely.
- Colonel Jerry M. Sage, the guerrilla leader and saboteur known as "Silent Death" and "Cooler King" who served in the OSS (the forerunner of the CIA) during World War II. He worked for fifteen months on the huge, three-tunnel project known in book and film as "The Great Escape" and was in charge of hiding over 200,000 pounds of golden sand from the German "ferrets". In the 1960s, he served as commander of the US Army 10th Special Forces Group (Airborne) at Bad Tölz in Bavaria.
- Peter Stevens, the only known German-Jewish bomber pilot in the Royal Air Force. Stevens (born Georg Franz Hein in Hanover) was a refugee living in London at the outbreak of hostilities, and assumed the identity of a dead London schoolmate in order to enlist. As the pilot of a Handley Page Hampden, he flew 22 combat operations before his plane was hit by flak over Berlin, and he force-landed (out of fuel) near Amsterdam on 8 September 1941. As a POW, he made nine escape attempts, and was one of only 69 members of the RAF to be awarded the Military Cross in World War II. Stevens was head of contacts (scrounging) for the "X" Organisation in East Compound of Stalag Luft III from 22 Apr 1943 until it was evacuated in late Jan 1945.
- Nicholas Alkemade, an English tail gunner in the Royal Air Force who survived a freefall of 18,000 feet (5,490 m).

Some held at Stalag Luft III went on to notable careers in the entertainment and sports industry:

- British actor Peter Butterworth and English writer Talbot Rothwell were both inmates; they became friends and later worked together on the Carry On films. Butterworth was one of the vaulters covering for the escapees during the escape portrayed by the book and film The Wooden Horse. After the war and as an established actor, Butterworth auditioned but "didn't look convincingly heroic or athletic enough" according to the makers of the film.
- British actor Rupert Davies had many roles in productions at the theatre in the camp; his most famous roles on film and TV may have been Inspector Maigret in the BBC series Maigret that aired over 52 episodes from 1960 to 1963 and George Smiley in the movie The Spy Who Came in from the Cold.
- English writer and broadcaster Hugh Falkus was an inmate at Stalag Luft III from around 1943, after his Spitfire was shot down over France. Falkus reportedly worked on 13 escape tunnels during his time as a POW, although never officially listed as an escapee.
- American novelist and screenwriter Len Giovannitti was held in Stalag Luft III's Center Compound. A navigator with the 742nd Bomb Squadron, 455th Bomb Group of the Fifteenth Air Force, he was on his 50th mission when his Consolidated B-24 Liberator was shot down over Austria on 26 June 1944. A POW for nearly a year, he incorporated his experiences, including the winter march to Germany and liberation in Bavaria, in his 1957 novel The Prisoners of Combine D.
- Caribbean/British barrister and entertainer Cy Grant, born in British Guiana, served as a Flight Lieutenant in the RAF and spent two years as a prisoner of war, including time at Stalag Luft III. After the war he qualified as a barrister but went on to be a singer, actor, and author. He was the first black person to be regularly seen on British television, singing the news as "topical calypsos" (punning on "tropical") on the BBC Tonight programme.
- Wally Kinnan, one of the first well known US television broadcast meteorologists, was also in the camp.
- Canadian Major League Baseball pitcher Phil Marchildon spent nine months in the camp. He resumed his baseball career after the war, winning 19 games for the 1947 Philadelphia Athletics.
- American children's television personality Ray Rayner was a prisoner in the camp.

Stalag Luft III inmates also became involved in politics:

- Justin O'Byrne, who spent more than three years as a POW, represented Tasmania in the Australian Senate for 34 years and served as President of the Senate.
- Professor Basil Chubb, author and political science lecturer, spent 15 months there after being shot down over Germany.
- Frederick Irving, later a US diplomat and civil servant.
- Charles W. Sandman Jr., a navigator in the USAAF, spent over seven months in Stalag Luft III. Sandman entered the camp weighing approximately 86 kg (190 lb) and left weighing 57 kg (125 lb). In his diary, Sandman describes the harsh winters and struggles to secure rations sent by the American Red Cross. After the war, he was elected to the US House of Representatives from New Jersey and was criticised for supporting President Nixon during the Watergate scandal.
- Peter Thomas, later created Lord Thomas of Gwydir after a political career as a Welsh Conservative politician and UK cabinet minister under Edward Heath, spent four years as a prisoner of war including being imprisoned at Stalag Luft III.
- Anthony Barber, later Baron Barber, went on to become a British Conservative politician who served as Chancellor of the Exchequer from 1970 to 1974.
- Calton Younger, author of No flight from the cage (1956) and other books.

== In popular culture ==
Paul Brickhill was an Australian-born Spitfire pilot, shot down in 1943 over Tunisia to become a prisoner of war. While imprisoned at Stalag Luft III, he was involved in the escape attempt. He did not take part in tunnelling but was in charge of "stooges", the relay teams who would alert prisoners that German search teams had entered the camp. He was originally scheduled to be an early escapee but when it was discovered he suffered from claustrophobia, he was dropped down to the bottom of the list. He later said that this probably saved his life. After the war, Brickhill co-wrote Escape to Danger with Conrad Norton in 1946. Following this, Brickhill wrote a larger study and the first major account of the escape, The Great Escape, published in 1950. This book brought the camp and escape to wider public attention and was the basis of the eponymous film, released in 1963. The film had numerous factual compromises to amplify its commercial appeal, such as including Americans among the escapees (none of whom were actually American). While some characters were fictitious, many were based on, or amalgams of, real people. There were no actual escapes by motorcycle or aircraft; the film sequence involving an escape in a German trainer aircraft may have been inspired by Bob Hoover's escape from Stalag Luft I in a Fw 190. Additionally, the recaptured prisoners were not executed in one place at the same time. The film popularised the story and memory of the fifty executed airmen despite its inaccuracies. The POW camp was actually officially referred to as "Stalag Luft 3" by the Germans in their documentation and on the ID tags issued to inmates, and Paul Brickhill, in his early writings about the escape, also wrote it that way. For The Great Escape, Brickhill's English editors changed the name to be formatted as "Stalag Luft III". The influence of The Great Escape on popular culture has resulted in the camp's name continuing to be formatted as "Stalag Luft III".

Eric Williams was a navigator on a downed bomber who was held at Stalag Luft III. After the war, on the long sea voyage home, Williams wrote Goon in the Block, a short book based on his experience. Four years later, in 1949, he rewrote it as a longer third-person narrative under the title The Wooden Horse, which was filmed as The Wooden Horse in 1950. He included many details omitted in his first book, but changed his name to "Peter Howard", Michael Codner to "John Clinton" and Oliver Philpot to "Philip Rowe". Williams also wrote a prequel, The Tunnel, an extended study of the mentalities of life as a prisoner of war. Although not an escape novel, it shows the profound urge to escape, and explores the ways that camp life affected men's emotions.

In a possible homage to the real Stalag Luft III prisoner Howard Cundall, the fictional American Staff Sergeant Kinchloe of the 1960s' American TV parody Hogan's Heroes operates a clandestine radio transmitter and receiver from a POW camp ("Stalag 13"). Kinchloe is able to use his radio equipment to contact London, as Howard Cundall did.

The search for those responsible for the murder of the Allied officers, and the subsequent trials, was depicted in a 1988 television film named The Great Escape II: The Untold Story. The murder of the prisoners in this film is more accurate than in the 1963 original, with the POWs being shot individually or in pairs but other portions of the film are fictional.

The camp was the basis for a single-player mission and multi-player map in the first Call of Duty video game. Most of the buildings and guard towers were identical to the camp and the single-player mission involved rescuing a British officer from a prison cell that closely resembled the camp's solitary confinement building. Stalag Luft is also a playable POW camp in the computer and Xbox game The Escapists, but with a slightly different name of "Stalag Flucht".

The Great Escape, a video game which shares a title and similar plot to the movie, was published for the ZX Spectrum by Ocean Software in 1986.

The Great Escape also was a game for Xbox and PlayStation 2 released in 2003. The plot-line follows that of the 1963 film, except there are also levels featuring some of the character's first captures and early escape attempts, as well as a changed ending.

A DVD of a 1983 reunion held in Chicago includes a reenactment of an interrogation between Hanns Scharff, master Luftwaffe interrogator known for his subtle approach, and American flying ace Francis Gabreski. This segment is hosted by Ray Tolliver, author of The Interrogator. Also included are short interviews with some of the former POWs.

The Apple TV miniseries Masters of the Air features Stalag Luft III in its later episodes; Majors Gale "Buck" Cleven and John "Bucky" Egan and others from the 100th Bomb Group were prisoners at the camp following the disastrous Bremen and Münster raids of October 1943, until its eventual closure.

== See also ==
- Christopher Hutton, British airman who invented escape tools
- Cowra breakout, largest prison escape of WWII
- Hogan's Heroes, 1965–1971 sitcom with a WWII POW camp setting
- Island Farm, site of "The German Great Escape"
- MI9, secret department of the British War Office focused on aiding Allied POW escapes
- MIS-X, section of the United States Department of War focused on aiding American POW escapes
- Stalag 17, 1953 film about airmen in a fictional POW camp
- Stalag Luft I, POW camp near Barth
- Stalag VIII-B, a notorious POW camp established when Stalag Luft III became overcrowded
- Oflag, a type of German-run POW camp for officers
- Masters of the Air, Apple TV+ series
