= Eric Williams (writer) =

English writer

Eric Williams MC
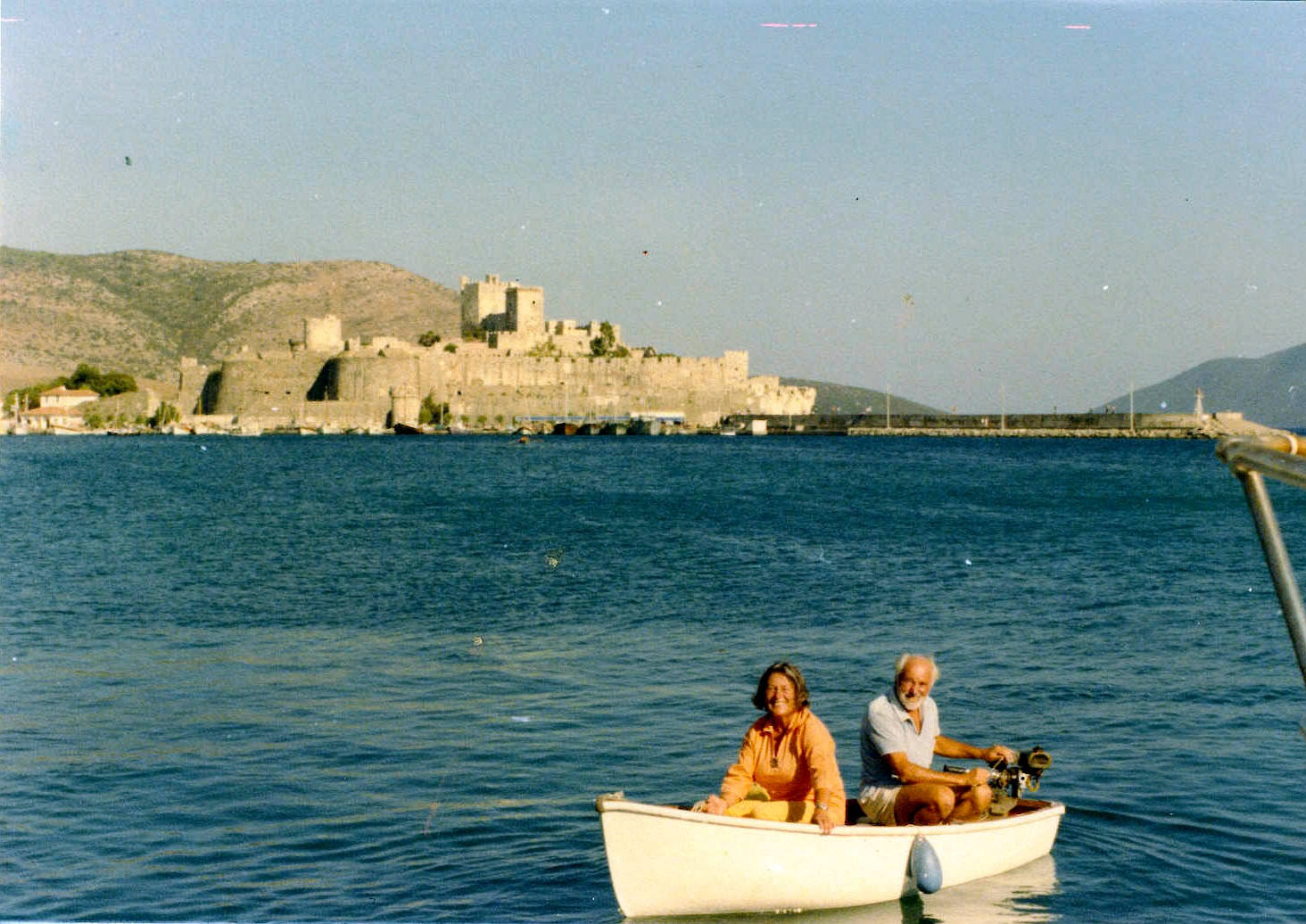
- Eric and Sibyl Williams in Bodrum Harbor, Turkey, July 1977
- Born: 13 July 1911
- Died: 24 December 1983 (aged 72)
- Occupation: Author
- Notable work: The Wooden Horse (1949)
- Spouses: Joan Mary Robets; Sybil Grain
- Military career
- Allegiance: United Kingdom
- Branch: Royal Air Force
- Service years: 1940–
- Rank: Flight lieutenant
- Unit: No. 75 Squadron RAF
- Conflicts: Second World War
- Awards: Military Cross

Eric Williams MC (13 July 1911 – 24 December 1983) was an English writer and former Second World War RAF pilot and prisoner of war (POW) who wrote several books dealing with his escapes from prisoner-of-war camps, most famously in his 1949 novel The Wooden Horse, made into a 1950 film of the same name.

== Early life ==
Eric Williams was born on 13 July 1911, and was educated at Christ's College, Finchley. In 1940, he joined the Royal Air Force.

== Capture ==
RAF Flight Lieutenant Eric Williams was the navigator of a 75 Squadron Short Stirling bomber (BK620) shot down on a bombing raid over Germany on 17/18 December 1942. He evaded capture for three days, but was eventually caught and sent to Oflag XXI-B at Szubin in German-occupied Poland. There he quickly formed a friendship with Lieutenant Michael Codner, who spoke French, and together they planned and executed an escape through a tunnel. However, they were quickly recaptured and, as punishment, sent to Stalag Luft III in Sagan (now Żagań in Poland).

== The "Wooden Horse" and escape ==
As described in his novelisation of the true events The Wooden Horse, Stalag Luft III was designed to be a highly escape-resistant camp. Tunnelling in particular was made harder by the use of numerous environmental and technological solutions: the perimeter fence was placed some distance from the huts, necessitating longer tunnels; the sandy soil was yellow when moist, a markedly different colour than the dry grey surface sand, making disposal of freshly dug tunnel soil difficult; and the Germans employed seismographs to measure vibration caused by digging.

Williams and Codner came up with the idea of constructing a vaulting horse and using it daily to cover the opening of a tunnel entrance close to the perimeter fence, while the other camp inmates vaulted continuously over the horse to mask the vibration of the tunnelling work. Sand was carried back inside the horse and dried in the attic of the camp canteen before being distributed in the compound. (Peter Tunstall and Dominic Bruce claim to have used a wooden horse to camouflage a tunnel opening in the Spangenberg concentration camp two years previously, in 1941).

With the assistance of a third POW, Oliver Philpot, the tunnel was completed by 29 October 1943 – an important factor, since Williams, Codner and Philpot planned to use the local railway to quickly put distance between themselves and the camp, rather than the usual escape strategy at the time of travelling on foot at night and hiding in barns or haystacks during the day, but the Escape Committee only had local railway timetables valid until the end of October.

The trio made their way by train to the Baltic; Philpot headed to Danzig (Gdańsk), while Williams and Codner, posing as French labourers, made their way to Stettin (Szczecin), where they eventually managed to make contact with the Danish Resistance and gain passage on a ship to Copenhagen and thence to Gothenburg in neutral Sweden. There they met Philpot, who had been able to travel more quickly to Sweden via Danzig. From Sweden, all three officers were repatriated to Britain.

After his return to active duty, Williams worked for MI9, the intelligence organization tasked with supporting available European Resistance networks and making use of them to assist Allied airmen shot down over Europe in returning to Britain. After a period of training in Canada, he was in Italy when the war in Europe ended. He was subsequently sent to the Philippines to do welfare work with liberated Allied prisoners of war. He was there when the war ended.

A signed copy of Williams' book The Wooden Horse was sold at auction in 2022, along with a vintage Rolex watch that was owned by Lt. Charles Maurice Anthony Whitaker, whom Williams had befriended during their time in Stalag Luft III.

== Writing career ==
At the end of the war, on the long sea voyage home on the RMS Queen Mary, Williams wrote Goon In The Block, a short book based on his experiences. Four years later, in 1949, he rewrote it as a much longer third-person narrative under the title The Wooden Horse. He included many details omitted in his previous book, but changed his name to "Peter Howard", Michael Codner to "John Clinton" and Oliver Philpot to "Philip Rowe". Two years later, he wrote The Tunnel, a prequel to The Wooden Horse that described his and Codner's escape from Oflag XXIB.

Williams also amassed a substantial collection of escape literature and published several anthologies of excerpts from this collection.

== Postwar ==
Williams spent much of the time after 1962 living on his boat Escaper in the Eastern Mediterranean with his wife Sibyl.

== Personal life ==
Williams married twice, first to Joan Mary Roberts in 1940, then to Sybil Grain MBE in 1948.

== Bibliography ==
- Goon in the Block, Collins, 1945.
- The Wooden Horse, Collins, 1949: revised and slightly augmented in 1979, in particular, removing the fictional episode in which a German dockside guard is killed, enabling the two escapers to board a boat and be smuggled to Sweden.
- The Tunnel, Collins, 1951.
- The Escapers: A Chronicle of Escape in Many Wars with Eighteen First-hand Accounts, Collins, 1953.
- Complete and Free. Travels through France & Italy. Eyre & Spottiswoode, 1957. (The description of Complete and Free as a record of travels is literally correct. However, this is actually a loosely autobiographical existential novel that explores the conflicts of individual freedom and the constraints of society. It remembers World War II, and the Wooden Horse escape, while describing Williams and his wife travelling in a post-war Europe devastated by the war, and riddled with smugglers, black market profiteers, and political opportunism.)
- Dragoman Pass, Collins, 1959.
- The Borders of Barbarism, 1961.
- More Escapers: In War and Peace with Eighteen First-hand Accounts, Fontana, 1968.
