= Oliver Philpot =

Canadian-born WWII air force officer

Oliver Philpot MC DFC
- Born: 6 March 1913; Vancouver, British Columbia, Canada
- Died: 29 April 1993 (aged 80); London
- Military career
- Allegiance: United Kingdom
- Branch: Royal Air Force
- Service years: 1939–1946
- Rank: Flight Lieutenant
- Service number: 77131
- Unit: 42 Squadron
- Awards: Military Cross; Distinguished Flying Cross
- Other work: Food industry executive

Oliver Lawrence Spurling Philpot MC DFC (6 March 1913 – 29 April 1993) was a Canadian-born Second World War Royal Air Force (RAF) pilot and subsequently a businessman, best known for being one of the three men to successfully escape from Stalag Luft III in the escape known as The Wooden Horse.

After the war, Philpot resumed his career in management in the food industry. He wrote the book Stolen Journey, in which he recounts daily life as a prisoner in various POW camps, ending with his escape via the Wooden Horse and his return to England.

== Early life ==
Philpot was born in Vancouver, British Columbia, the son of an expatriate London engineer. Holding both British and Canadian citizenships he returned to England as a child. He was educated, first at Aymestrey School near Worcester, then at Radley College between 1927 and 1932 and then studied Philosophy, Politics and Economics at Worcester College, Oxford University. During his time at Oxford, he joined the Oxford University Air Squadron and learned to fly.

Upon graduating in 1934, he joined Unilever as a management trainee and in 1936 was appointed assistant commercial secretary in Unilever's home margarine executive. This proved to be useful in his wartime escape as the post required him to travel extensively in Germany and to learn to speak German.

== War service ==
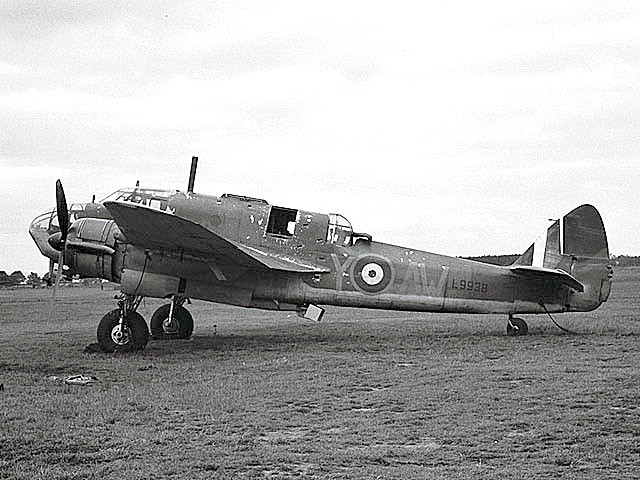
A 42 Squadron Bristol Beaufort

Service in the University Air Squadron automatically made Philpot a member of the Royal Air Force Volunteer Reserve (RAFVR) on its formation in 1936. With the approach of the war, Philpot was recalled for service in August 1939 and posted as a pilot officer on probation to 42 Squadron, an 18 Group Coastal Command unit then operating Vickers Vildebeest torpedo bombers. The squadron re-equipped with the Bristol Beaufort in 1940 and took part in the Norwegian Campaign.

Philpot was confirmed in his rank on 15 January 1941 and later in the same year was awarded the Distinguished Flying Cross (DFC). Promotion to Flying Officer soon followed and it was Flying Officer Philpot who took off in Beaufort O - Orange for an attack on a German convoy off Norway on 11 December 1941. During the mission, the aircraft was shot down by German anti-aircraft fire and ditched in the North Sea. Philpot and the other three crew evacuated the plane and took to the dinghy. After two days in the dinghy, they were picked up by a German naval vessel.

== Prisoner of war ==
Philpot was suffering from the effects of the two days in the dinghy and was at first sent to a German military hospital in Oslo. After several weeks, he was moved to Dulag Luft I near Frankfurt arriving in January 1942. Only a month later he was transferred to Oflag IX-A/H at Spangenberg. This was a brief stay and in April 1942 the RAF prisoners at Spangenberg were all sent to Stalag Luft III at Sagan. Escape was always a thought, having first been considered while in the hospital immediately after capture, and at Sagan Philpot was involved in more than one escape attempt. In August, Philpot was promoted to flight lieutenant. In September 1942, Philpot was among a number of prisoners transferred to Oflag XXI-B at Szubin (In his book Philpot uses the German spelling: Schubin) in Poland, the winter of 1942–43 being spent here before the camp closed and all prisoners returned to Stalag Luft III.

On his return to Sagan, Philpot was returned to the east compound, where he had previously been held; in the interim period, most of his friends had been moved to the north compound. Escape schemes were not as common as they had been in 1942, but Philpot hit upon the idea of inventing an escape character and papers etc. before involvement with any escape, rather than the opposite way round. After some thought, he decided that his character would be a Norwegian margarine salesman called Jon Jörgensen. The profession was based on Philpot's own civilian career and the nationality was common enough to be encountered in Germany, but with a reduced likelihood of meeting someone who spoke Norwegian, as Philpot did not speak any Norwegian. With the assistance of a Norwegian POW the character was fleshed out even to the extent of making him a Quisling.

=== The Wooden Horse ===
The Wooden Horse was the idea of Lieutenant Michael Codner RA and Flight Lieutenant Eric Williams. They approached Philpot in June 1943 to 'register' their escape scheme with the escape committee, Philpot being the escape co-ordinator for the hut in which the three of them lived.

With the scheme approved, Codner and Williams set to work. A vaulting horse was constructed from stolen timber, plywood with cigarette package wrappings used for the top. After a period of legitimate use, Codner and Williams started to dig a tunnel from inside the horse. One man was carried out in the horse and the tunnel started by digging a shaft, lined with plywood panels from Red Cross parcel boxes. After each session, care was taken to secure the top of the shaft and to replace the surface sand on top. The digger and the sand excavated were carried back into a hut and the sand disposed of. Initially Philpot assisted in disposing of the sand, but later on Codner and Williams asked him to join in the digging and become one of the escapers. Digging was a cramped job and sand was dragged back to the bottom of the shaft by the digger and then placed into bags for lifting and disposal. Only 12 bags per session were lifted. After a while, the team swapped to a four-cycle dig-and-lift scheme, where two men went out on the first trip and dug 36 bags of sand. For the next three trips, one man went out and recovered 12 bags each time. As the tunnel grew longer, a bowl and string were used for pulling the sand back. Although this was slightly slower (36 bags per cycle as opposed to 48 under the old system), it meant three shorter sessions and one longer one for the volunteers using the horse for vaulting, an important change as the number of volunteers was small and they were becoming tired.

Experimentation with a poker showed that the tunnel was about 30 inches (76 cm) below ground but also running approximately 30° off the intended course. The tunnel had several narrow escapes from detection or accidental destruction due to digging by either the guards or other POWs, but by the beginning of October it was past the wire and the three men started to make their final preparations. They decided to make the break in the period of no moon at the end of the month and escape on Friday, 29 October 1943. This was 114 days after the first digging commenced.

On the morning of 29 October, Philpot and Codner were carried out to the tunnel as normal to collect some sandbags. Philpot returned with the bags while Codner remained in the tunnel all day to continue the digging. Codner's absence from the evening roll-call was covered and then the horse was used to carry three men to the tunnel: Philpot and Williams, together with a third man named McKay to seal the three escapers into the tunnel. The three broke out just after 6 p.m. It had previously been agreed that Philpot would travel alone as Jörgensen, while Codner and Williams would travel together posing as French workmen. Philpot made his way to Sagan station, where he caught the train to Frankfurt (as did Williams and Codner). Arriving at Frankfurt, Philpot intended to catch the night train to Küstrin, but it was cancelled and he had to wait until the next morning for the next train. After spending the night in some woods, Philpot took the train to Küstrin and then onto Danzig. After almost giving himself away by falling off his case and swearing in English, his false papers were good enough to survive checking by a police officer.

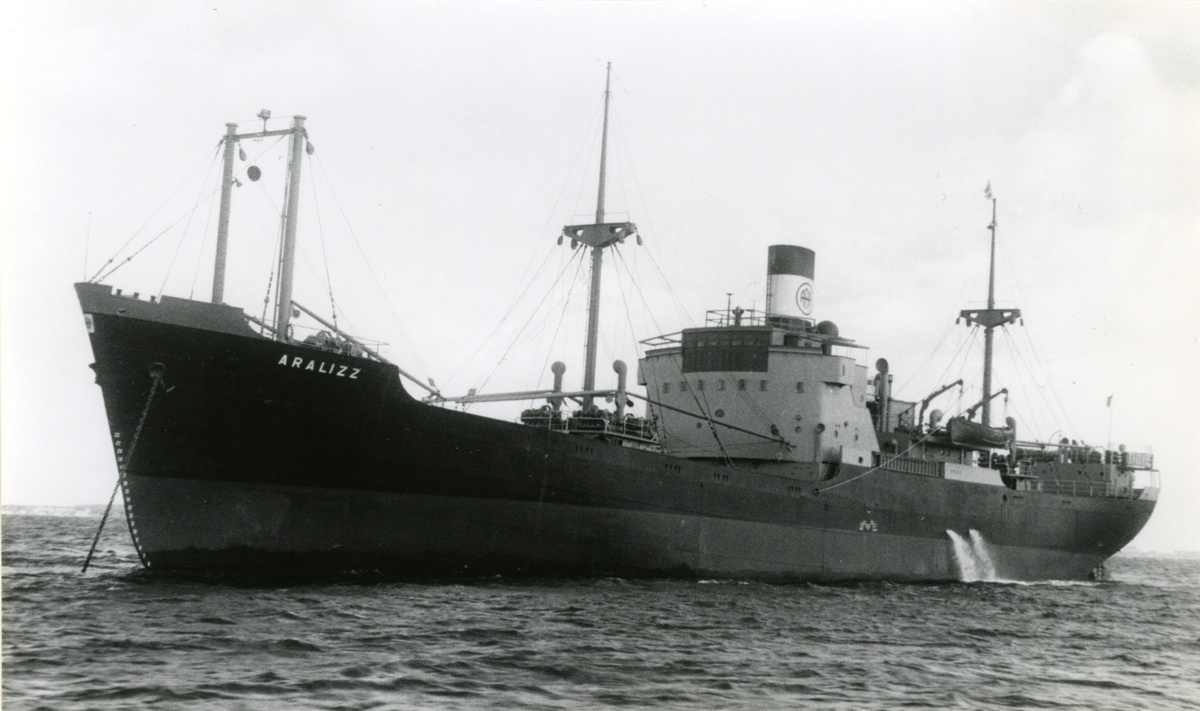
The Swedish vessel Aralizz that Philpot smuggled himself onto in Danzig harbour

Arriving in Danzig less than 24 hours after escaping from Stalag Luft III, Philpot started to look for a neutral ship to carry him across the Baltic Sea to Sweden. After an initial reconnaissance and looking for somewhere to sleep, he checked into a hotel even though this required him to share a room with another guest. The next day (Sunday), Philpot spent the day around the Swedish dock and in the evening managed to smuggle himself onto a Swedish ship called the Aralizz. The crew of the Aralizz saw him and the captain asked him to leave as he was placing the crew at risk, but Philpot refused. Without the knowledge of the captain, the chief engineer and a seaman hid Philpot until Tuesday, when the ship sailed. Once the ship was at sea, Philpot again made his presence known to the captain, who took a different attitude now the ship was no longer in port.

After the ship arrived in Sweden, Philpot was handed over to the Swedish police and taken to the British Legation in Stockholm on Thursday 4 November 1943—less than five days since the breakout. A week later, he was reunited with Codner and Williams, who had used a similar route via Stettin to escape. Williams, Codner and Philpot were the only three men to escape from the east compound at Stalag Luft III and regain their freedom (the so-called "home run").

Philpot returned to the United Kingdom on a BOAC flight just before Christmas to be reunited with his family. He did not return to operational flying and after debriefing by MI9 he was posted to the Air Ministry as a senior scientific officer. He was subsequently awarded the Military Cross on 16 May 1944.

== Postwar career ==
After being demobbed in 1946, Philpot resumed his career in the food industry, eventually becoming chief executive of Findus, the frozen food company. He later became managing director of Remploy. Philpot was Chairman of Robert Windsor Ltd in the late 1960s (A subsidiary of Union International based in Smithfield and run by the Vestey family). He also served as chairman of the RAF Escaping Society.

In 1950 Philpot wrote an autobiography of his experience as a prisoner of war and escapee. He titled the book Stolen Journey, and it was illustrated by Ronald Searle.

Oliver Philpot was an active member of London Rowing Club, Putney, London. He rowed the Boat Race course from Putney to Mortlake until his 70s. His ashes were scattered on the Thames at Putney.
