= Avro 613 =

General information
- Type: Night bomber
- National origin: United Kingdom
- Manufacturer: Avro
- Status: Cancelled

The Avro 613 was a 1920s-proposed British design by Avro to meet an Air Ministry requirement for a twin-engined night bomber. A prototype was ordered but it was not built.

== Development ==
Air Ministry Specification B.19/27 was issued in August 1927 for a twin-engined night bombing landplane to replace the Vickers Virginia. In May 1928, Avro designed the Avro 613 with two Armstrong Siddeley Jaguar engines to meet the specification. Six companies submitted proposals and four were selected to be built for flight trials, the Avro 613, Fairey Night Bomber, Handley Page HP.38 and the Vickers Type 150. A contract was placed with Avro to produce one prototype but it was not built. The B.19/27 was won by the Fairey Night Bomber which became the Fairey Hendon, and the HP.38 was also ordered into production as the Handley Page Heyford.
