= Richard Bethell =

Richard Bethell may refer to:

- Richard Bethell (16th century MP), Member of Parliament (MP) for Winchester
- Richard Bethell, 1st Baron Westbury (1800–1873), British judge and Liberal politician, Lord Chancellor 1861–1865, MP for Aylesbury 1851–1859, for Wolverhampton 1859–1861
- Richard Bethell (1772–1864), MP for Yorkshire 1830–1831, for East Riding of Yorkshire 1832–1841
- Tony Bethell (Richard Anthony Bethell, 1922–2004), World War II Royal Air Force pilot and survivor of "the Great Escape"
