= Vickers Vanox =

British biplane bomber design

Vanox
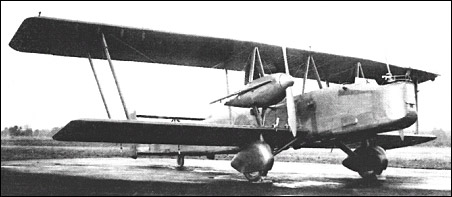

General information
- Type: Bomber
- Manufacturer: Vickers
- Number built: 1

History
- First flight: 30 November 1929

The Vickers Vanox was a British biplane bomber design intended as a successor to the Virginia for the Royal Air Force. Although it underwent extensive development, it was not successful, only a single aircraft being built.

== Design and development ==
Conceived as a biplane powered by the Bristol Jupiter radial engine it would have much better performance than the Virginia with similar engines. Initially a private venture, the submission of the Vickers design to the Air Ministry coincided with the issuing of Air Ministry specification B.19/27 for a Virginia replacement.

The B.19/27 specification meant that the Vickers submission would be tested competitively in trials against other manufacturer's designs. In the redesign to meet the specification, the B.19/27 project took the Virginia Mark X all moving rudder together with an all-moving tailplane. Three designs were submitted in total; two biplanes with Jupiter and geared Bristol Mercury engines respectively and a monoplane version. The Mercury-engined design, the Vickers Type 150 was selected by the Ministry for consideration and building, now to be funded by the Ministry, started. Partway through it was agreed that an alternative engine was allowable, the Rolls-Royce F.XIV (later developed into the Rolls-Royce Kestrel).

The aircraft flew for the first time on 30 November 1929. The aircraft was a two-bay biplane of all-metal construction, with a biplane tailplane and with the two engines mounted between the wings.

Initial testing and evaluation showed that the aircraft had poor handling, being unstable laterally, prone to Dutch roll and to severe flexing of the rear fuselage. Following a forced landing it was rebuilt incorporating recommendations made in reports from Ministry test pilots to try to resolve these problems, and was powered by Kestrel III engines. It was then given the name Vickers Vanox by Vickers.

These changes did not solve the aircraft's handling problems, and the sweepback of the wings was reduced, which did resolve the handling problems. The Kestrel engines proved unreliable, and were replaced by more powerful Bristol Pegasus radial engines. In this form, the aircraft was designated the Vickers Type 195 Vanox, and was demonstrated to meet the requirements of specification.

Following further modifications in February 1933 to improve performance, with extended, three-bay wings being fitted, it was now designated the Type 255. However, by this time, the competing Handley Page Heyford and Fairey Hendon bombers had already been ordered into production, so the sole Type 255 was used for aerial refuelling trials work by the Royal Aircraft Establishment, being flown for the last time on 7 January 1938.

== Specifications (Type 150) ==
Data from The British Bomber since 1914

General characteristics

- Crew: 4
- Length: 60 ft 6 in (18.44 m)
- Wingspan: 76 ft 6 in (23.32 m)
- Height: 19 ft 3 in (5.87 m)
- Wing area: 1,367 sq ft (127.0 m^{2})
- Airfoil: RAF 34
- Empty weight: 10,435 lb (4,733 kg)
- Gross weight: 15,400 lb (6,985 kg)
- Max takeoff weight: 16,170 lb (7,335 kg)
- Powerplant: 2 × Rolls Royce F.XIV evaporatively-cooled V12 engines, 480 hp (360 kW) each

Performance

- Maximum speed: 125 mph (201 km/h, 109 kn) at 11,000 ft (3,400 m)
- Range: 920 mi (1,480 km, 800 nmi)
- Service ceiling: 23,000 ft (7,000 m)
- Time to altitude: 19 min 45 s to 6,500 ft (2,000 m)

Armament

== See also ==
Aircraft of comparable role, configuration, and era

- Handley Page Heyford
- Fairey Hendon
