= Les Long =

British bomber pilot (1915–1944)

James Leslie Robert Long
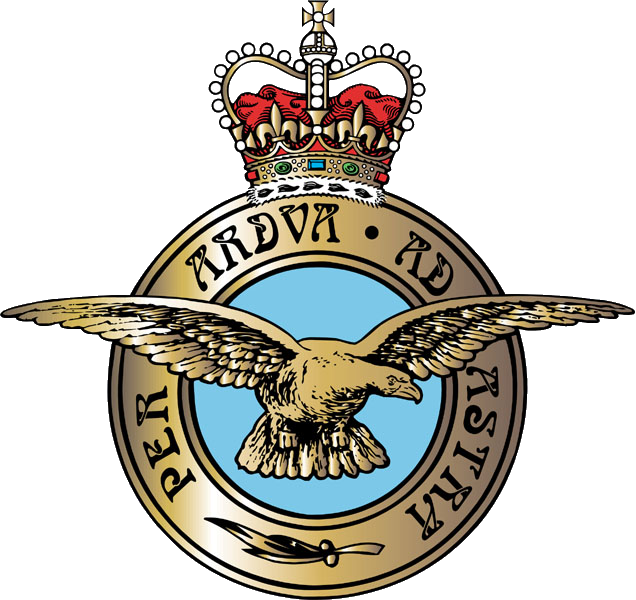
- Born: James Leslie Robert Long; 21 February 1915; Bournemouth, England
- Died: 12 April 1944 (aged 29)
- Burial place: Poznan Old Garrison Cemetery, Poland
- Military career
- Allegiance: United Kingdom
- Branch: Royal Air Force
- Service years: 1939–1944
- Rank: Flight Lieutenant
- Nickname: Cookie
- Service number: 89375
- Unit: No. 9 Squadron RAF
- Conflicts: World War II: Channel Front (POW)
- Awards: Mentioned in Despatches

James Leslie Robert Long (21 February 1915 – 12 April 1944), known as Cookie, was a British Vickers Wellington bomber pilot who was taken prisoner during the Second World War. He took part in the 'Great Escape' from Stalag Luft III in March 1944, but was one of the men re-captured and subsequently murdered by the Gestapo.

== Pre-war life ==
Long grew up in Somerset, where his father owned a large grocery store, and was educated at Taunton. His father was a senior member of the Octagon Chapel a congregation of the Plymouth Brethren and Les Long grew up within the religious community. He was educated at Huish's Grammar School Taunton. Despite passing the entrance examination for Oxford University he was apprenticed to the General Accident Insurance Company to train as an inspector. After an adventurous holiday in Ireland he returned home and joined the Civil Air Guard determined to get his civil pilot's licence. His call up papers were issued soon after the Second World War broke out and he applied for the Royal Air Force to complete his pilot training.

== War service ==
On 19 April 1940 Long commenced his service with the Royal Air Force Volunteer Reserve with service number 922353 and by 24 December 1940 had been promoted to Leading Aircraftman and awarded his pilot brevet (wings). He was commissioned on 24 December 1940. He was posted to No. 19 Operational Training Unit to prepare for operational service with a squadron. On 3 March 1941 he was posted to No. 9 Squadron RAF flying Vickers Wellington bombers. As a junior pilot he flew as second pilot in experienced crews to gain experience but his operational career was to be short.

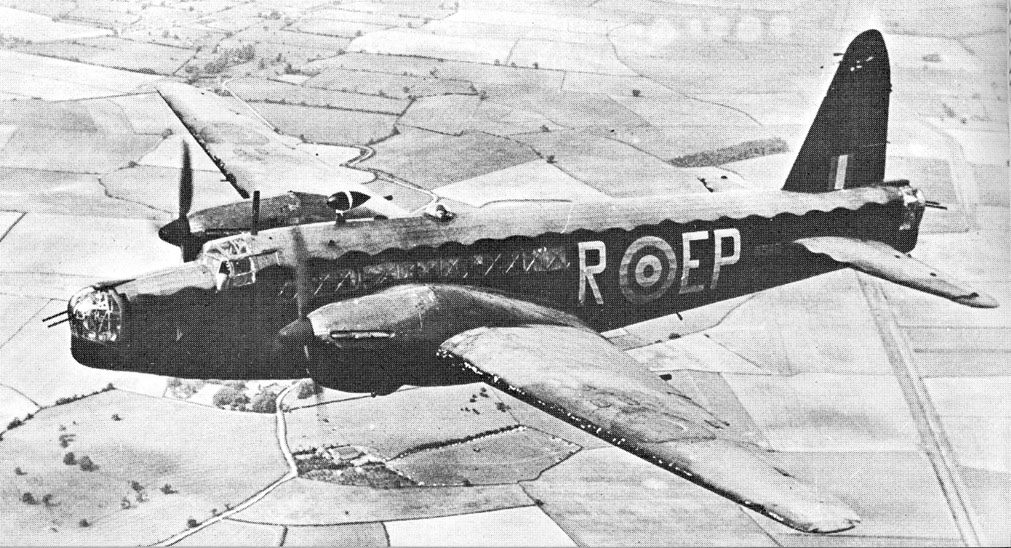
The Merlin-engined Wellington Mark II. This aircraft actually belongs to No. 104 Sqn. Notice the criss-cross geodesic construction through the perspex fuselage panels.

== Prisoner of war ==
At 19:43 hours on the evening of 27 March 1941 Long took off in a Wellington Mark Ic bomber (serial number R1335) from RAF Honington to attack a target at Cologne, Germany. They suffered with engine problems but arrived at the target and bombed but at 2248 that night a message was received that the bomber was having to crash land in the Netherlands, it had been badly shot up by a Luftwaffe night fighter. The entire crew were made prisoner of war near Limbourg, Belgium. As a prisoner of war he was interrogated by the Luftwaffe before being sent to Stalag Luft I Barth where he and his pilot, John Shore, immediately became involved in escape attempts involving tunneling out of the camp during one of which Shore got out and made it home to England via Sweden. Long was one of an initial batch of persistent escapers, who were sent to the new Stalag Luft III in the province of Lower Silesia near the town of Sagan (now Żagań in Poland) on 21 March 1942. He tried to escape during the transfer between camps but was recaptured. He was an enthusiastic tunneller, and did much to improve and lengthen the tunnel codenamed "Tom".

In between tunneling Long studied economics with text books sent from home with a 2-day period of study during enforced bed time after an injury during tunnelling.

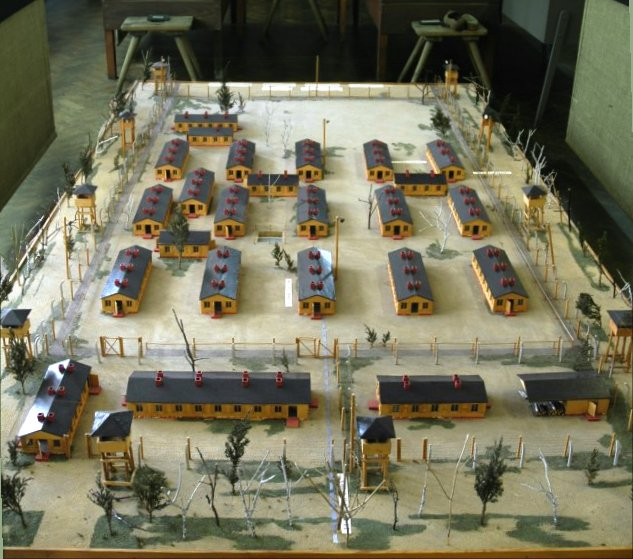
Model of Stalag Luft III prison camp.

He was promoted to flying officer on 23 December 1941, and flight lieutenant on 23 December 1942.

== 'Great Escape' ==
In preparations for the Great Escape operation Long was one of the leading tunnellers. During the escape he made two emergency repairs to the tunnel due to roof falls and after breaking out quite late accompanied by Tony Bethell who was an appointed "marshal", one of the dozen men appointed to wait in the forest after escaping to collect a pre-selected group of ten men who would then be led westwards as initial stage guides Long joined a group known as the "hard arsers" because they planned to walk alone the entire trip homewards rather than catching trains. He was one of the 76 men who escaped the prison camp on the night of 24–25 March 1944 in the escape now famous as "the Great Escape" but on the evening of 29 March 1944 Long and Tony Bethell arrived at Görlitz prison from Sagan police station where they had been held after recapture. Long's party had become lost in the dense forest and ended up beside the Russian compound of Stalag Luft III only to be set on the right direction by Bethell who then teamed up with Long. They made excellent progress after that walking alongside the main railway line to Frankfurt (Oder) but found the trains travelling too fast to jump aboard. On 27 March 1944 they were arrested by German Home Guard (sic) and arrived at the collecting point for recaptured officers in Görlitz prison on 29 March 1944. Regularly groups of officers were taken away by the Gestapo in a variety of vehicles until just Long and Max Ellis remained at Görlitz They were regularly moved from cell to cell until finally being separated on 11 April 1944. Ellis saw Long on 12 April 1944 and on 13 April 1944 he asked to borrow Long's comb, but was told by a guard that "he left yesterday". No trace of Long was ever found.

Long was one of the 50 escapers executed and murdered by the Gestapo. He was cremated at Breslau. Originally his remains were buried at Sagan, he is now buried in part of the Poznan Old Garrison Cemetery.

Memorial to "The Fifty" down the road toward Żagań (Long is on the right)

Long was named beside Stanislaw Krol and Pawel Tobolski on the supplementary list of prisoners "shot while attempting to escape" which was handed to prisoners at Stalag Luft III on 18 May 1944, though his name was not in the list of the murdered prisoners which was published in the press in the UK and Commonwealth countries when news broke on or about 20 May 1944. (Post-war investigations saw a number of those guilty of the murders tracked down, arrested and tried for their crimes.)

Shortly afterwards, a communication arrived from England to advise Long that he had successfully completed the requirements for a degree of Bachelor of Arts in Economics.

== Awards ==
Reportedly Mentioned in despatches for bravery as a prisoner of war (none of the other relevant decorations then available could be awarded posthumously). Those awards to his fellow escapers were published in a supplement to the London Gazette on 8 June 1944, but the award to Long cannot be found there.
