= No. 9 Squadron RAF =

Flying squadron of the Royal Air Force

No. IX (B) Squadron RAF
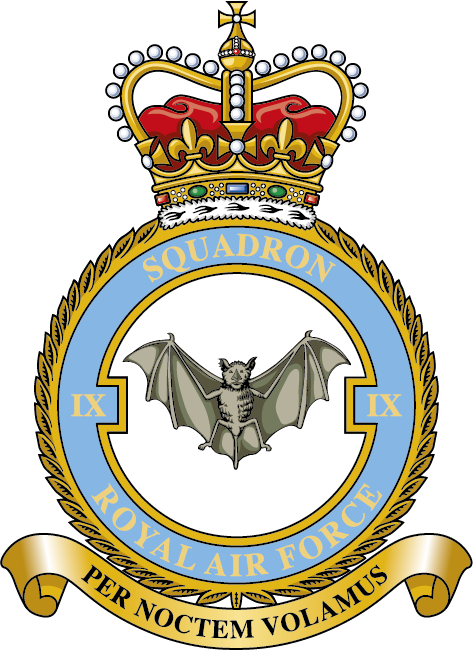
- Squadron badge
- Active: 1914–1915 (RFC); 1915–1918 (RFC); 1918–1919; 1924–1961; 1962–1982; 1982–2019; 2019–present
- Country: United Kingdom
- Branch: Royal Air Force
- Type: Flying squadron
- Role: Multi–role combat; Aggressor
- Part of: Combat Air Force
- Station: RAF Lossiemouth
- Mottos: Per noctem volamus (Latin for 'We fly through the night')
- Aircraft: Eurofighter Typhoon FGR4

Commanders
- Current commander: Wing Commander C M Pearson
- Notable commanders: Major Hugh Dowding

Insignia
- Roundel
- Tail codes: KA (Feb 1939 – Sep 1939); WS (Sep 1939 – Apr 1951); AA–AZ (Aug 1986 – Mar 2019); WS (May 2019 – present)

Number 9 Squadron (also known as No. IX (Bomber) Squadron or No. IX (B) Squadron) is the oldest dedicated bomber squadron of the Royal Air Force. Formed in December 1914, it saw service throughout the First World War, including at the Somme and Passchendaele. During the Second World War, No. IX (B) Squadron was one of two Avro Lancaster units specialising in heavy precision bombing (the other was No. 617 Squadron) and sank the battleship Tirpitz on 12 November 1944 in Operation Catechism. Between 1962 and April 1982, the squadron flew the Avro Vulcan B.2 as part of the V-Force. In June 1982, it became the first front-line squadron in the world to operate the Panavia Tornado GR1. In May 1998, No. IX (B) Squadron received the RAF's first Tornado GR4, which it operated until re-equipping with the Eurofighter Typhoon FGR4 at its present home station of RAF Lossiemouth on 1 April 2019 as an Aggressor Squadron. On 3 July 2024, while deployed on NATO operations in the Black Sea region, IX (B) Squadron were officially certified as a Multi-Role Combat Ready Squadron.

== History ==
=== First World War (1914–1919) ===
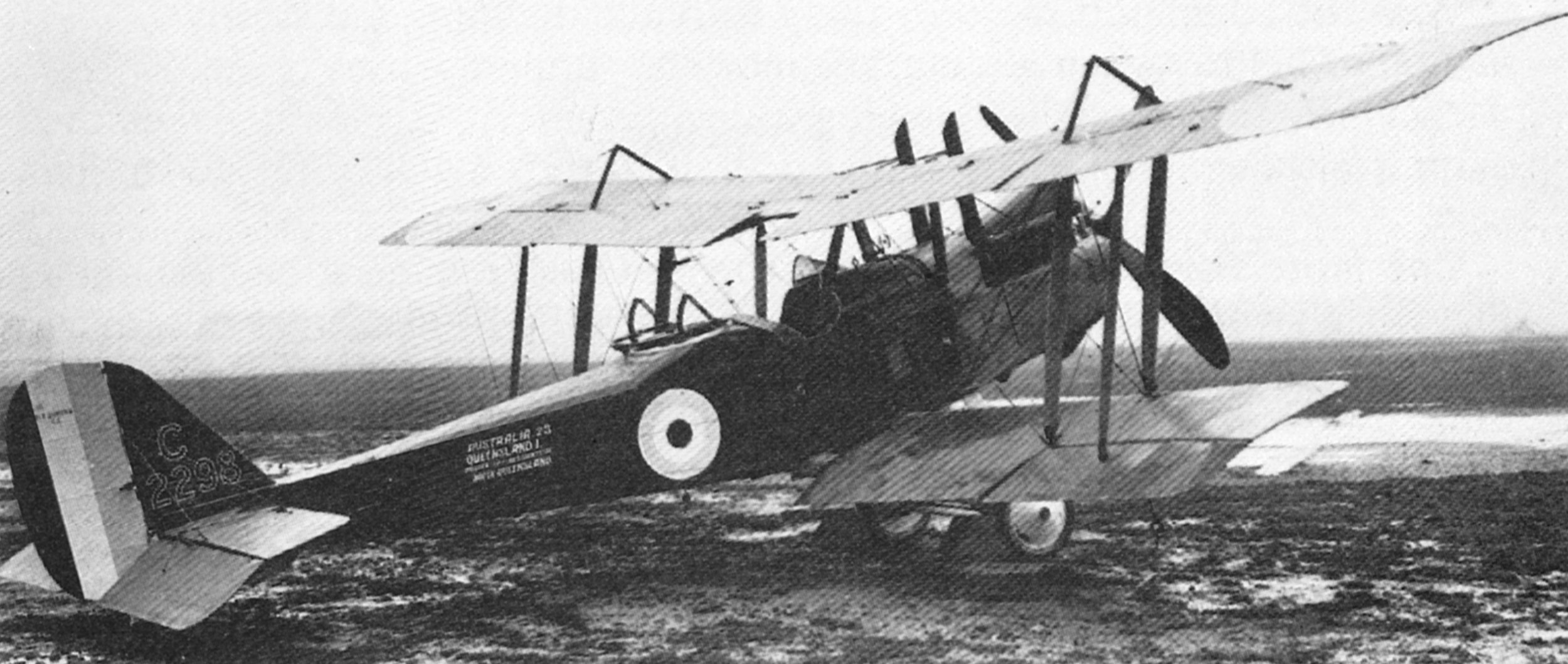
A Royal Aircraft Factory R.E.8, similar to what No. 9 Squadron operated between 1917 and 1918.

No. IX (B) Squadron was formed on 8 December 1914 at Saint-Omer in France, the first outside of the UK, from a detachment of the Royal Flying Corps (RFC) Headquarters Wireless Flight. Known as No. 9 (Wireless) Squadron, it was tasked with developing the use of radio for reconnaissance missions through artillery spotting. This lasted until 22 March 1915 when the squadron was disbanded and had its equipment dispersed amongst No. 2 Squadron, No. 5 Squadron, No. 6 Squadron and No. 16 Squadron.

The squadron reformed at Brooklands in Surrey on 1 April 1915, under the command of Major Hugh Dowding (later commander of RAF Fighter Command during the Battle of Britain) as a radio-training squadron, flying the Farman MF.7, Blériot XI and Royal Aircraft Factory B.E.2. The squadron moved to Dover in Kent on 23 July, re-equipping with the Royal Aircraft Factory B.E.8a, Avro 504 and a single Martinsyde S.1, before returning to Saint-Omer on 12 December as an army co-operation squadron. Moving to Bertangles on 24 December, No. 9 Squadron commenced bombing missions on 17 January 1916 with the B.E.2c. It flew reconnaissance and artillery spotting missions during the Battle of the Somme in 1916, assisting the British Army's XIII Corps on the first day. It later operated during the Second Battle of Arras in 1917.

It re-equipped with the Royal Aircraft Factory R.E.8 in May 1917, using them for artillery spotting and contact patrols during the Battle of Passchendaele, during which it suffered 57 casualties, and carrying out short range tactical bombing operations in response to the German spring offensive in March 1918. While it started to receive Bristol Fighters in July 1918, it did not completely discard the R.E.8 until after the end of the war. No. 9 Squadron returned to the UK in August 1919, arriving at Castle Bromwich where it remained until disbanding on 31 December 1919.

=== Between the wars (1919–1938) ===
The squadron's life as a bomber unit began on 1 April 1924, reforming at RAF Upavon in Wiltshire, quickly moving to RAF Manston in Kent, flying the Vickers Vimy. Less than a year later, the squadron re-equipped with the Vickers Virginia heavy bomber, occasionally supplemented by Vickers Victoria transports, which it retained until this was replaced by the Handley Page Heyford in 1936.

On 31 January 1939, No. IX (B) Squadron became the third RAF squadron to receive the modern Vickers Wellington monoplane, when their first Wellington arrived at RAF Stradishall in Suffolk – reaching full strength by April.

=== Second World War (1938–1945) ===
==== 1939–1943 ====
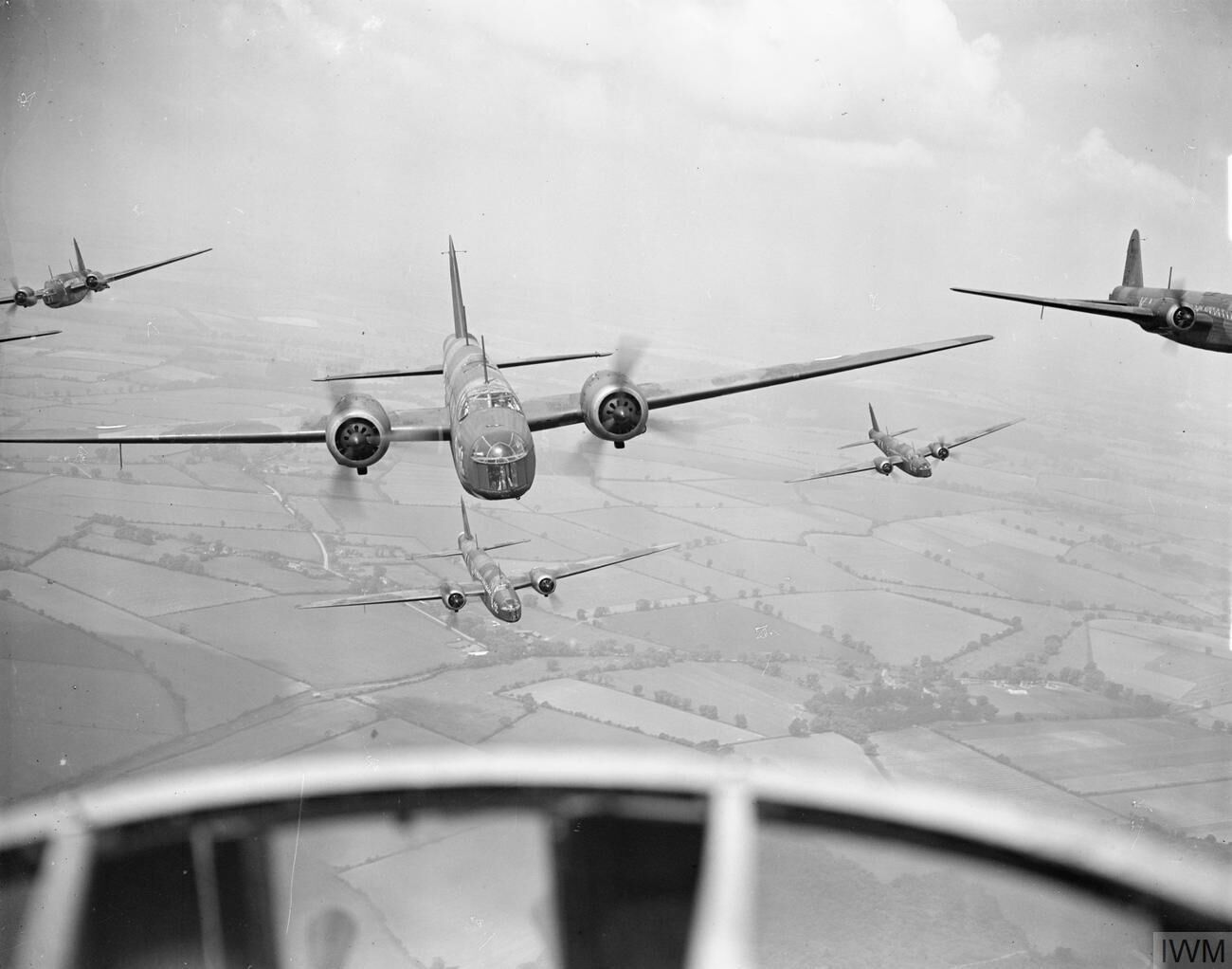
Vickers Wellington Mk.Is of No. 9 Squadron, on a mission in WW2, flying in formation.

The Second World War began with the unit being one of the few equipped with modern aircraft, the Vickers Wellington bomber, flying out of RAF Honington in Suffolk; the Wellington later gave way to the Avro Lancaster in September 1942 upon the squadron's move to RAF Waddington in Lincolnshire, with which the unit would complete its most famous sorties.

On 4 September 1939, the squadron's Wellington aircraft and crews were the first to hit the enemy; the first to get into a dogfight; possibly the first to shoot down an enemy aircraft; the first to be shot down by one; and towards the end of the war, the first to hit the German battleship Tirpitz with the Tallboy 12,000-pound bomb, an achievement by the crew of an Avro Lancaster on her 102nd operation with the squadron.

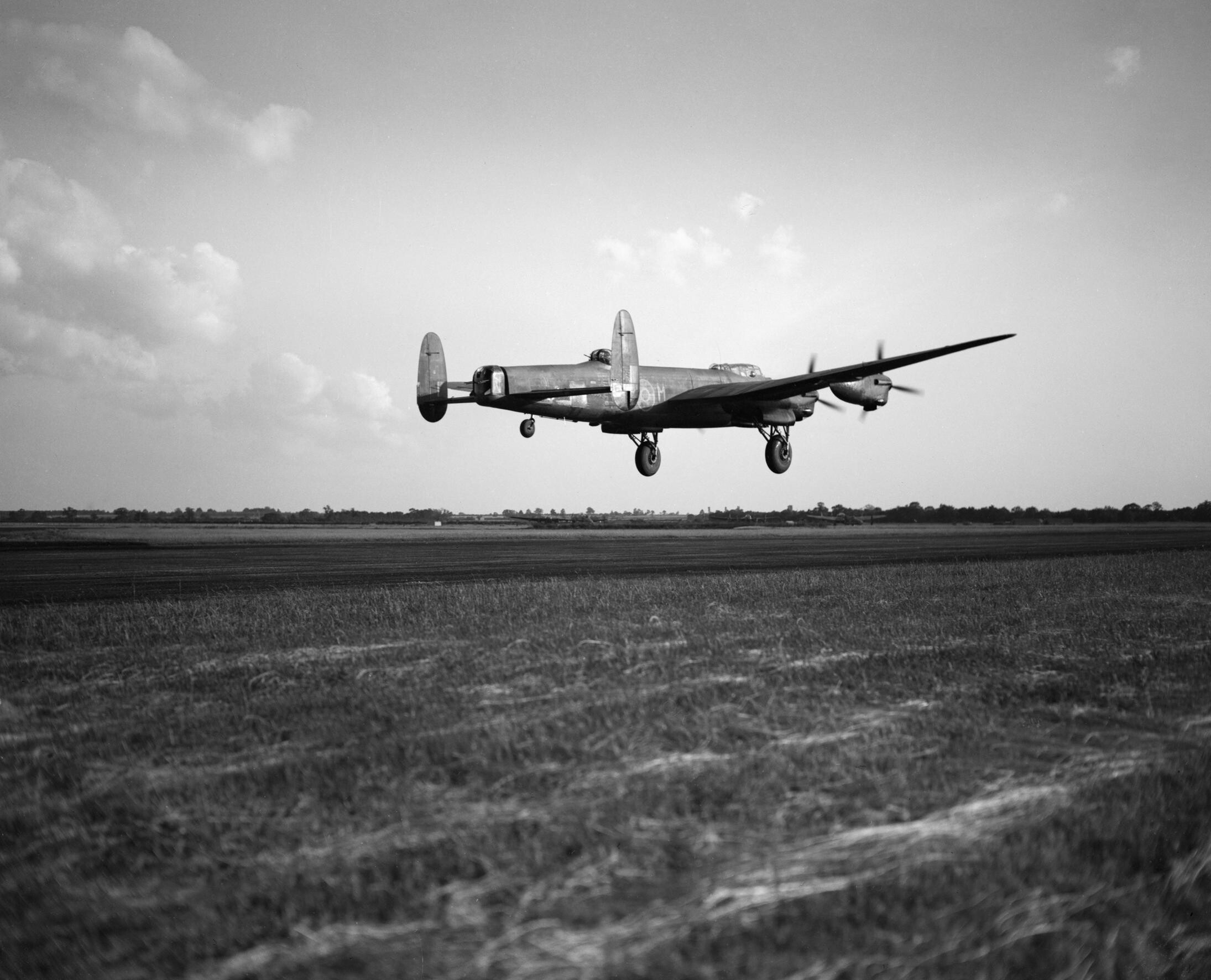
An Avro Lancaster B.3, of No. 9 Squadron taking off from RAF Bardney, Lincolnshire, for a raid on the Zeppelin works at Friedrichshafen in Germany.

No. IX (B) Squadron fought with RAF Bomber Command in Europe throughout the Second World War; took part in all the major raids and large battles; and pioneered and proved new tactics and equipment. It also produced several of the leading figures in The Great Escape, such as Les 'Cookie' Long, as well as Colditz inmates – including the legendary 'Medium Sized Man' Flight Lieutenant Dominic Bruce originator of the famous 'tea chest' escape. They became one of the two specialised squadrons attacking precision targets with the Tallboy bomb, and led the final main force raid, on Berchtesgaden in Germany on 25 April 1945.

==== The sinking of Tirpitz (1944) ====
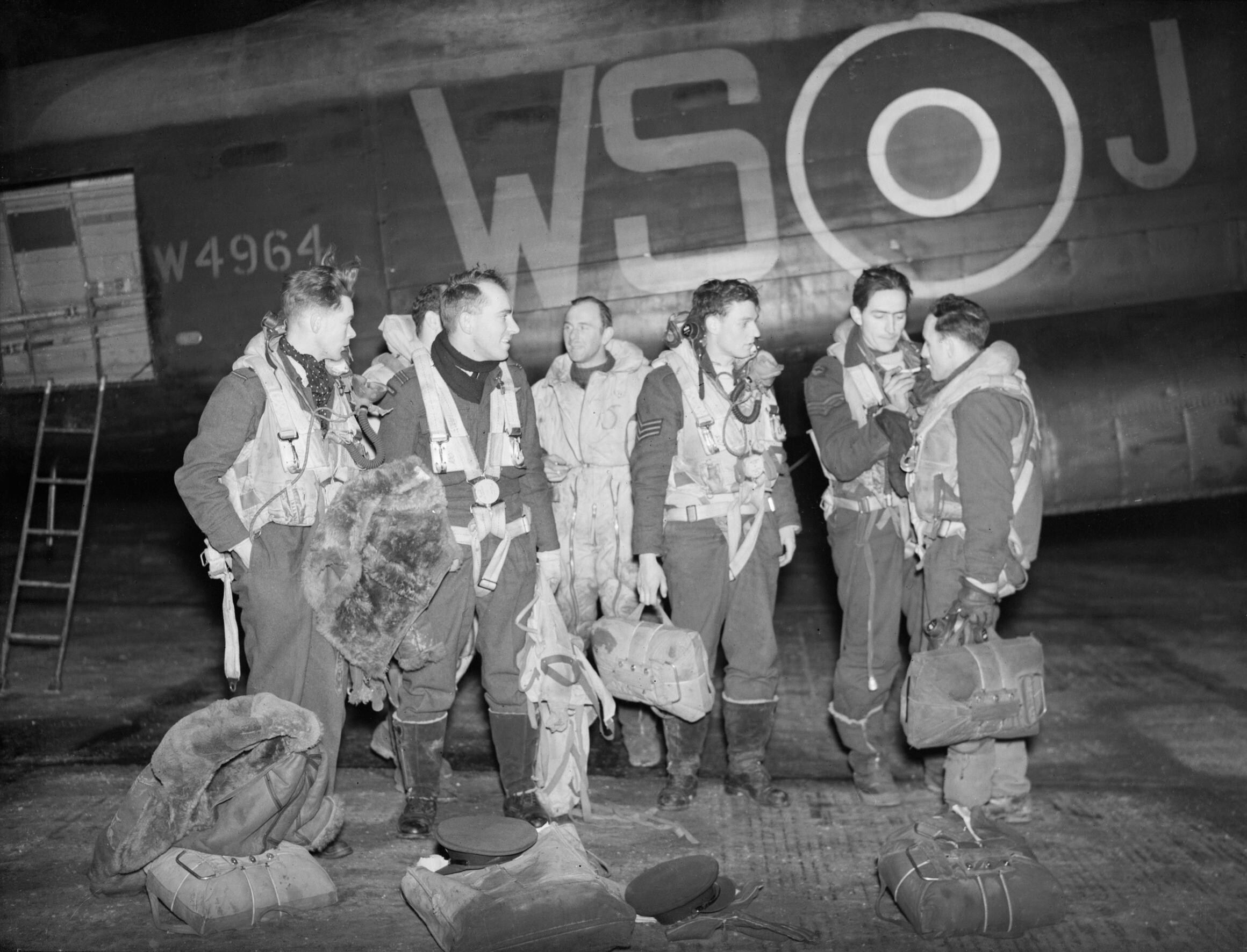
A No. 9 Squadron aircrew shortly after returning from a raid in January 1944.

The battleship Tirpitz had been moved into a fjord in Northern Norway where she threatened the Arctic convoys and was too far north to be attacked by air from the UK. She had already been damaged by a Royal Navy midget submarine attack and a second attack from carrier born aircraft of the Fleet Air Arm. Both attacks however had failed to sink her. The task was given to No. IX (B) Squadron and No. 617 Squadrons who, operating from a base in Russia, attacked Tirpitz with Tallboy bombs which damaged her so extensively that she was sent to Tromsø to be used as a floating battery. This fjord was in range of bombers operating from Scotland. There in October from a base in Scotland she was attacked again. Finally on 12 November 1944, the two squadrons attacked Tirpitz. The first bombs missed their target, but following aircraft scored three direct hits in quick succession causing the ship to capsize. All three RAF attacks on Tirpitz were led by Wing Commander J. B. "Willy" Tait. Both squadrons claim that it was their bombs that actually sank Tirpitz, however it was the Tallboy bomb dropped from No. IX (B) Squadron Lancaster WS-Y (LM220) piloted by Flying Officer Dougie Tweddle to which the sinking of the warship is attributed. Tweddle was awarded the Distinguished Flying Cross for his part in the operations against Tirpitz.

Due to the sinking of Tirpitz having been attributed to the squadron, an intense rivalry developed between No. 617 (the junior squadron in terms of RAF squadron seniority) and No. IX (B) Squadron after the sinking of the warship. The Tirpitz bulkhead that was presented to Bomber Command by the Royal Norwegian Air Force, in commemoration of friendship and co-operation during the Second World War was of particular interest with both squadrons "owning" the bulkhead at various times until 2002, when the bulkhead was presented to the RAF Museum at Hendon.

==== 1945 ====
On 25 April 1945, No. IX (B) Squadron flew their last operational mission of the war when they, along with No. 617 Squadron, attacked Obersalzberg – targeting the Berghof, Eagle's Nest (residences of Adolf Hitler) and the local SS barracks. Seventeen Lancasters of No. IX (B) Squadron participated, with eleven bombing the primary target and one bombing a local bridge. With the end of the war in Europe, No. IX (B) Squadron was assigned to the 'Tiger Force', which was composed of multiple Bomber Command squadrons, with the intention of striking the Japanese Empire. However, due to the Atomic bombings of Hiroshima and Nagasaki in August 1945, the war was brought to an end before this could be carried out, although No. IX Squadron was deployed to India to carry out aerial survey work until April 1946.

=== Post–War ===
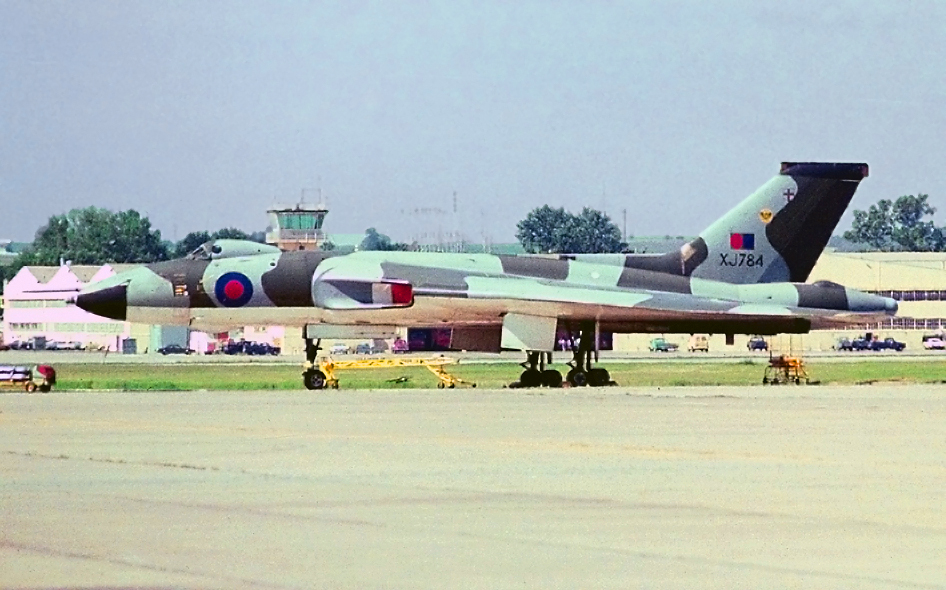
A No. IX (B) Squadron Avro Vulcan B.2 at Offutt AFB, 1976.

After the War, the Lancaster was replaced by the Avro Lincoln until 1952, when the squadron re-equipped with English Electric Canberra B.2 jet-bombers. They were used during three months of operations in Malaya in 1956 and during the Suez Crisis. No. IX (B) Squadron was disbanded on 13 July 1961.

Reforming on 1 March 1962 at RAF Coningsby in Lincolnshire, No. IX (B) Squadron converted to the Avro Vulcan B.2 and became part of the V-Force of RAF Bomber Command. Their Vulcans were equipped in late 1966 with WE.177 nuclear bombs at RAF Cottesmore in the low-level penetration role and assigned to NATO's Supreme Allied Commander Europe (SACEUR), before spending six years in the same role 1969–74 at RAF Akrotiri, Cyprus, as part of the Near East Air Force Wing where the squadron formed part of the UK's commitment to Central Treaty Organization. Between 1975 and 1982 the squadron was based at RAF Waddington, again assigned to SACEUR, and still equipped with WE.177 in the low-level penetration role, before disbanding in April 1982.

=== Tornado (1982–2019) ===
==== 1982–1990 (Honington to Brüggen) ====
No. IX (B) Squadron began to form at RAF Honington in Suffolk in early 1982 under Wing Commander P. J. Gooding, with the squadron receiving its first Panavia Tornado GR1 on 6 January. The first IX (B) Squadron Tornado sortie was made from Honington on 6 April. The squadron was officially reformed on 1 June, becoming the world's first operational Tornado squadron. The squadron was again equipped with WE.177, handed down from the Vulcan force. The squadron was officially declared combat ready to SACEUR in January 1983. No. IX (B) Squadron suffered the RAF's first Tornado loss on 27 September 1983, when Tornado GR1 ZA586 suffered complete electrical failure causing the pilot Squadron Leader. M. Stephens to order ejection. The navigator, Flight Lieutenant N. Nickles, safely ejected from the aircraft however Stephens failed to eject and was lost in the crash.

During their time at RAF Honington, the squadron featured in the RAF recruitment film Tornado, produced in 1985 by the Central Office of Information. The film features a training exercise in which Tornado crews prepare and execute a strike on a coastal surface-to-air missile site. On 1 October 1986, No. IX (B) Squadron moved to RAF Brüggen as part of RAF Germany, becoming the fourth Tornado squadron to be based there.

==== Gulf War and Yugoslavia (1991–2000) ====
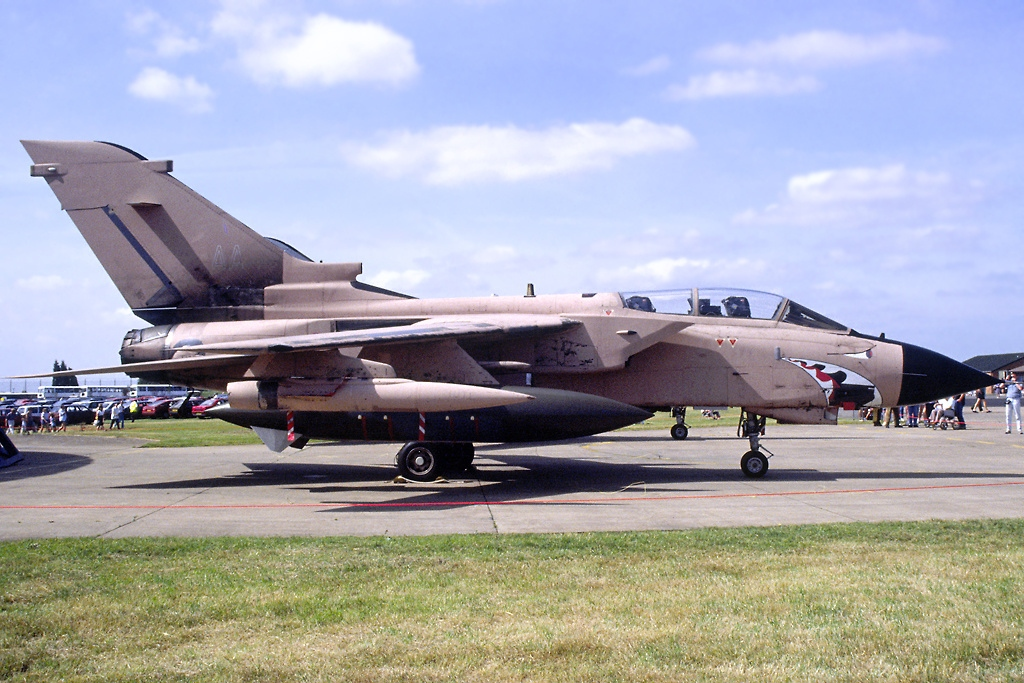
A No. IX (B) Squadron Panavia Tornado GR.1 in Gulf War markings at RAF Alconbury, 1991.

In the build up to the First Gulf War in 1990, personnel of No. IX (B) Squadron were deployed to Tabuk Air Base and Dhahran Airfield in Saudi Arabia, as well as Muharraq Airfield in Bahrain. As part of Operation Granby, crews from these bases flew their first sorties on 17 January 1991 to gain air superiority over Iraqi airspace. Initial bombing raids were focused on Iraqi air bases with the Tornado using unguided 1000lb bombs and JP233 submunition delivery systems to knock out runways. On 20 January, the squadron lost Tornado GR1 ZD893 near Tabuk when its control column failed to respond properly shortly after takeoff. After jettisoning their external stores, the crew attempted two landings to no avail, forcing the crew to eject. Over the course of the campaign, No. IX (B) Squadron flew two-hundred sorties dropping three-hundred 1000lb bombs. The squadron suffered no loses in combat throughout the conflict, only losing ZD893 outside of combat.

In the aftermath of Operation Granby, no-fly zones were set up over Iraq, with Operation Warden beginning in 1991 in the north and Operation Jural in the south in 1992. No. IX (B) Squadron along with other RAF Brüggen-based squadrons, each conducted four month long tours of duty as part of Operation Jural. Returning home to RAF Brüggen after Operation Granby, No. IX (B) Squadron continued to maintain their nuclear delivery role until 1994.

On 11 May 1998, the first Tornado GR4 was delivered to No. IX (B) Squadron at RAF Brüggen. As a result of the Strategic Defence Review in 1998 it was planned decided that in 2001, No. IX (B) Squadron and No. 31 Squadron, would relocate from RAF Brüggen to RAF Marham, Norfolk.

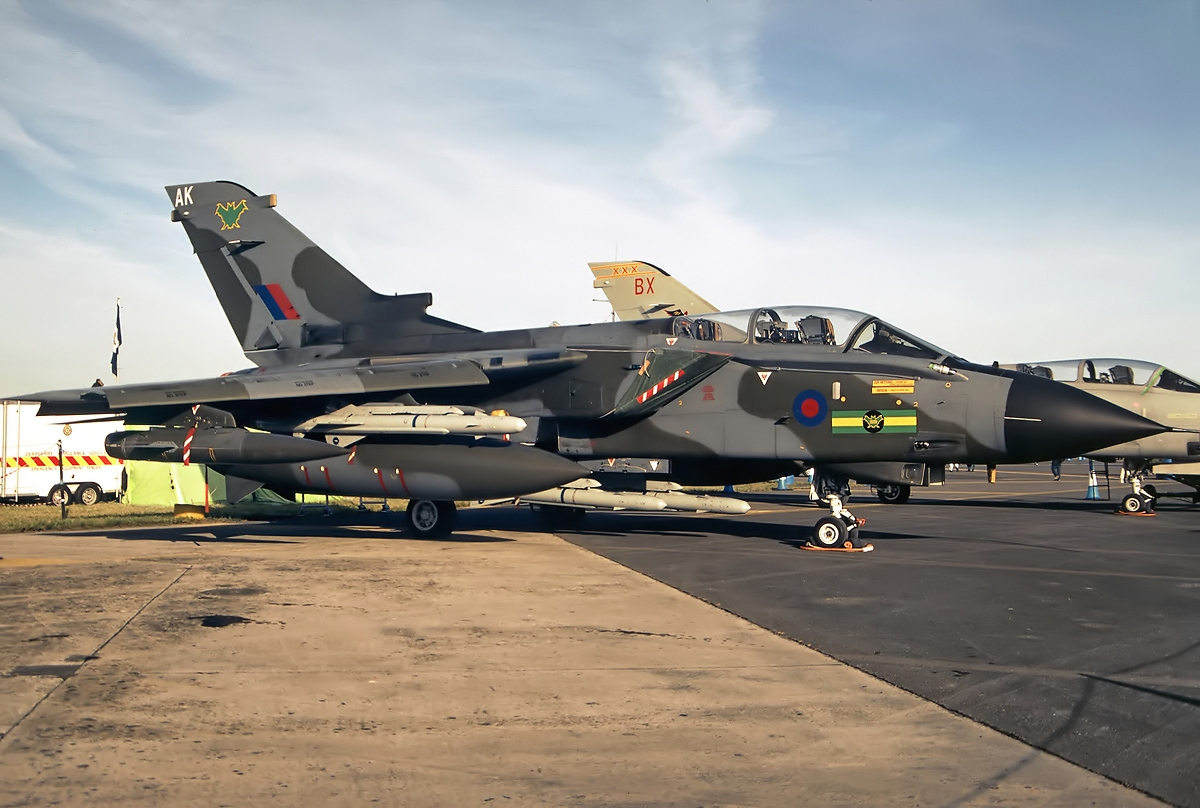
A No. IX (B) Squadron Panavia Tornado GR.4 in 1998.

No. IX (B) Squadron participated in the 1999 NATO bombing of Yugoslavia to liberate Kosovo as part of Operation Engadine, the British contribution to NATO's Operation Allied Force. Initial sorties were flown from RAF Brüggen but the squadron later deployed to Solenzara Air Base, Corsica, along with No. 31 Squadron. In 1999, No. IX (B) Squadron became the first operational Tornado GR4 squadron.

==== Iraq War, Libya and Afghanistan (2001–2011) ====
Under the command of Wing Commander Derek Watson, the squadron formed part of Operation Telic, the British involvement in the Iraq War, after being deployed in February 2003. No. 2 Squadron, No. IX (B) Squadron, No. 13 Squadron, No. 31 Squadron and No. 617 Squadron contributed to Tornado GR4 Wing 1 based at Ali Al Salem Air Base, Kuwait. No. IX (B) Squadron suffered its only loss of the war on 22 March 2003, when a Tornado was shot down by an American Patriot surface-to-air missile system in Kuwait while returning from a mission. The pilot, Flight Lieutenant Kevin Barry Main, and navigator, Flight Lieutenant David Rhys Williams, were both killed. Immediately after the incident it was claimed that the RAF crew had failed to switch on their identification friend or foe system. However a US journalist embedded with the United States Army unit operating the Patriot battery said the "army Patriots were mistakenly identifying friendly aircraft as enemy tactical ballistic missiles."

While the Tornado GR4 was capable of carrying the ALARM anti-radiation missile, No. IX (B) Squadron and No. 31 Squadron specialised in the role, in which they were known as "Pathfinder" squadrons. From 2004 to 2010, The squadron annually deployed in support of Operation Telic.

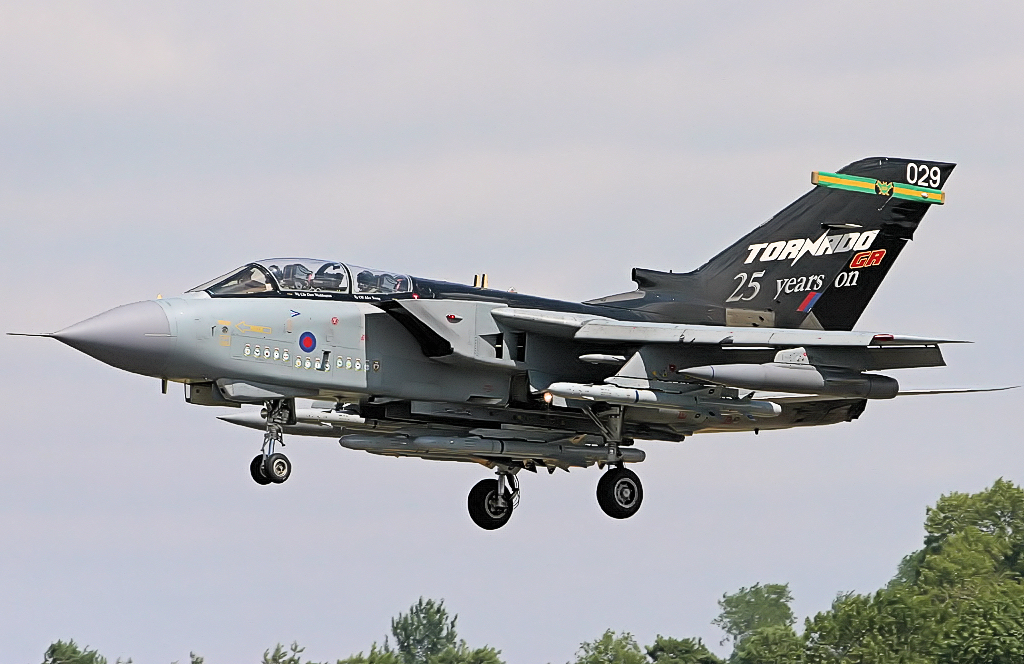
No. IX (B) Squadron Panavia Tornado GR.4 ZA469 at RIAT in 2007. (This aircraft is today preserved at IWM Duxford).

No. IX (B) Squadron saw its first tour of duty in Afghanistan, on Operation Herrick at Kandahar Airfield in early January 2010, taking over from No. 31 Squadron. The squadron's Tornados flew both close air support (CAS) missions in support of ground forces, as well as flying multiple reconnaissance missions using the Raptor and Litening III pods. The squadron handed over their duties to No. 2 (AC) Squadron on 13 April after a three-month deployment. In that time the squadron launched 450 times, amassed nearly 1,600 flying hours and undertook almost forty CAS missions. The penultimate leg of the squadron's journey home was completed aboard HMS Albion from Santander in Spain, due to air travel disruption after the 2010 Eyjafjallajökull eruption.

In March 2011, No. IX(B) Squadron was the first RAF Tornado squadron to participate in Operation Ellamy, the British involvement in Libyan Civil War. The squadron performed the second-longest ranged attack sorties in the history of the RAF and the first to be launched from the UK mainland since the Second World War, launching from the squadron's home base at RAF Marham and carrying out Storm Shadow cruise missile strikes, hitting targets deep inside Libya. The squadron then deployed forward to continue operations from Gioia del Colle in Southern Italy. After a brief respite from the action, during which it was relieved by No. 2 (AC) Squadron, the squadron was selected to return to Gioia del Colle. Squadron aircrew of No. IX (B) Squadron were inside Libyan airspace on 20 October 2011 when the conflict came to an end with the capture of Colonel Gaddafi by National Transitional Council fighters. The squadron returned to Marham on 1 November 2011. The squadron was one of only three in the RAF awarded the right to emblazon the battle honour Libya 2011 on their squadron standard.

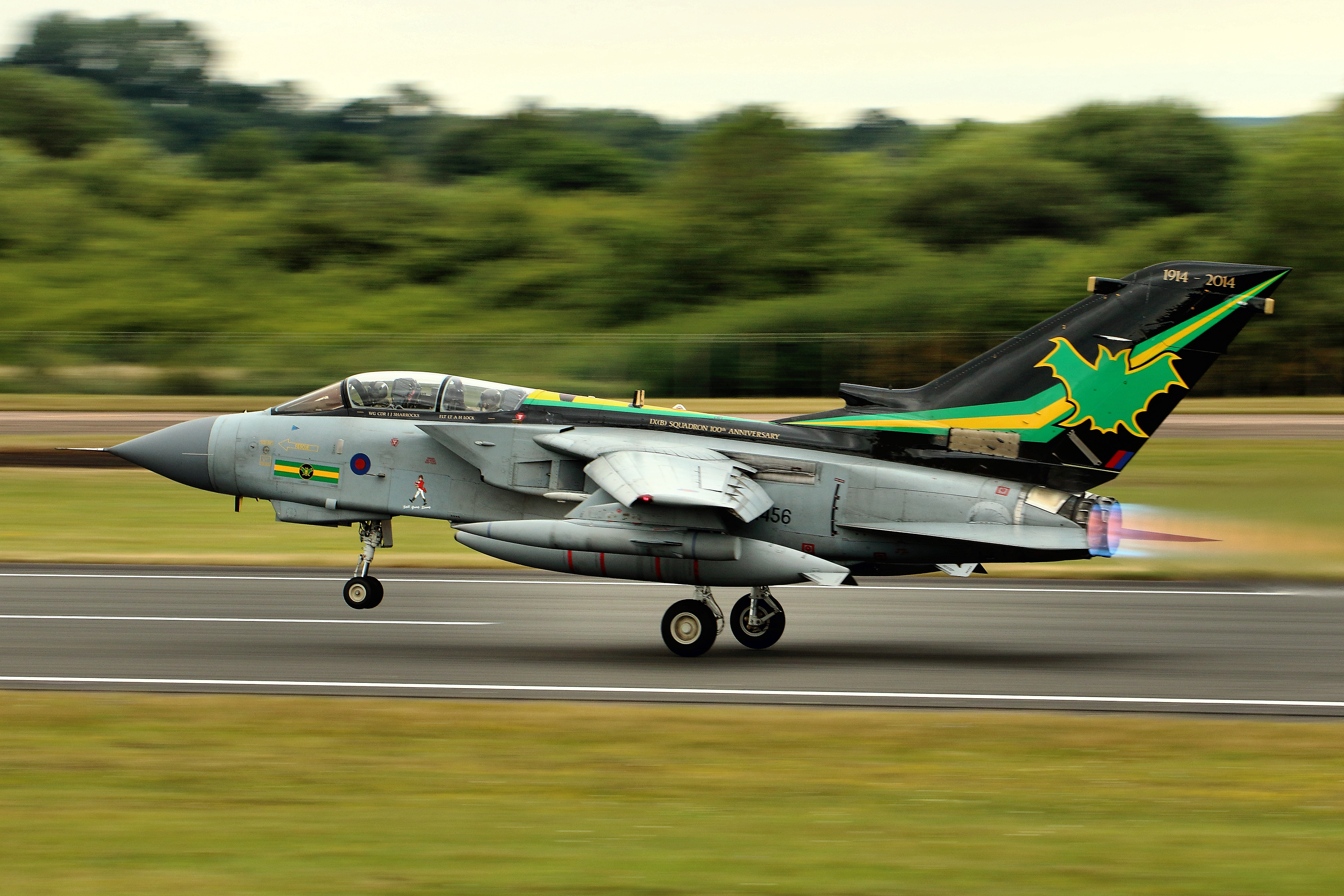
No. IX (B) Squadron Panavia Tornado GR.4 ZA456 in a special scheme celebrating 100 years of No. 9 Squadron, 2015.

==== Return to Afghanistan (2012–2014) ====
No. IX (B) Squadron returned to Kandahar Airfield in Afghanistan as part of Operation Herrick in December 2012, taking over from No. 2 (AC) Squadron. No. IX (B) Squadron was deployed for four months before returning to RAF Marham on 18 March 2013. The squadron participated in Exercise Red Flag 14-1 at Nellis Air Force Base in the United States between 27 January and 14 February 2014, operating alongside and against units of the US Air Force, US Navy, US Marine Corps and the Royal Australian Air Force.

No. IX (B) Squadron's last deployment to Afghanistan was in June 2014 when they again took over from No. 2 (AC) Squadron before being replaced by No. 31 Squadron in September – the last RAF Tornados to be deployed. To celebrate 100 years of No. IX (B) Squadron, Tornado GR4 ZA356 was painted in a special commemorative scheme to mark the occasion.

==== Operations in Iraq and Syria (2014–2019) ====
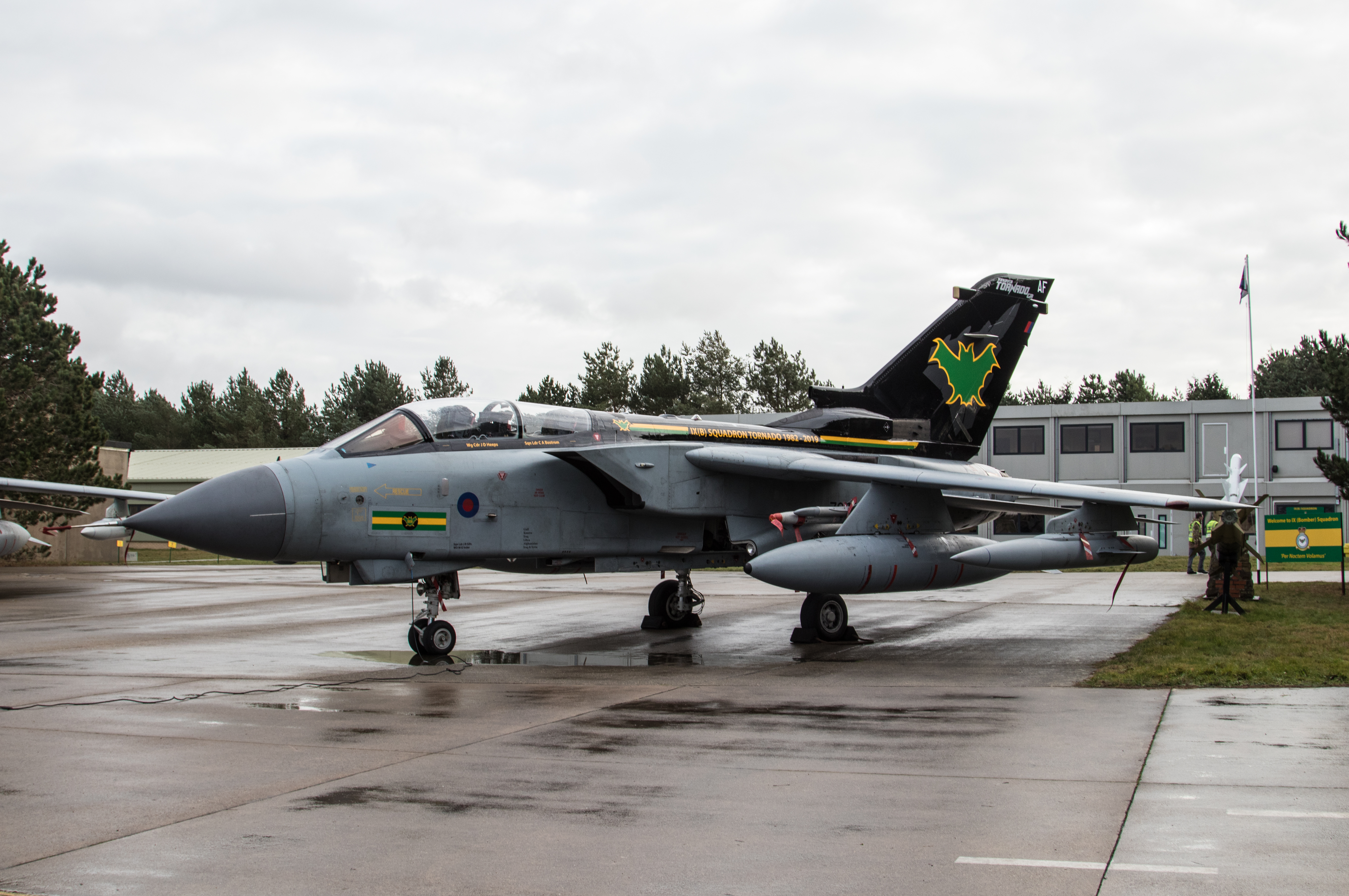
No. IX (B) Squadron Tornado GR.4 ZG775 in a special scheme to mark the retirement of the Tornado, 2019.

On 11 August 2014, the British government decided to deploy RAF Tornados from RAF Marham to RAF Akrotiri to help support aid efforts to refugees in the Iraqi Sinjar Mountains, who were under attack by terrorist organisation Islamic State (IS). On 26 September, the UK Parliament voted in favour of airstrikes against IS, with the first strikes occurring on 30 September. No. IX( B) Squadron contributed to the 1,300 missions conducted by RAF Tornados and the General Atomics MQ-9 Reapers during the first year of action against IS.

On 8 December 2014, squadron members both past and present held a service at Saint-Omer to mark 100 years since No. 9 Squadron was first formed. After Parliament approved strikes in Syria on 2 December 2015, the squadron's aircraft carried attacks the same day on IS owned oil fields in al-Omar, Syria.

On 14 April 2018, the squadron's aircrew participated in the missile strikes against Syria in response to the Syrian government's suspected chemical attack in Douma.

On 10 July 2018, nine Tornados of No. IX (B) Squadron and No. 31 Squadron participated in a flypast over London to celebrate the Royal Air Force's 100th anniversary. On 6 November 2018, the RAF unveiled Tornado GR4 ZG775 in a special commemorative No. IX (B) Squadron scheme to celebrate the squadron's 37 years of Tornado operations, the first of three Tornado retirement schemes to be made public.

On 4 and 5 February 2019, the eight Tornados of No. IX (B) Squadron and No. 31 Squadron that had been deployed to RAF Akrotiri returned home to RAF Marham ahead of the Tornado's retirement on 31 March 2019. The squadrons held a joint parade at Marham on 14 March 2019 to mark the impending disbandment of the Tornado force. Although the parade flypast was the Tornado's last planned sortie in RAF service, both squadrons maintained readiness for operations until the type's out-of-service date of 31 March 2019. The two squadron commanders simultaneously lowered their pennants at 09:31 on the following day, making No. IX(B) Squadron the world's first and the RAF's joint-last operational Tornado squadron.

=== Eurofighter Typhoon (2019 onwards) ===
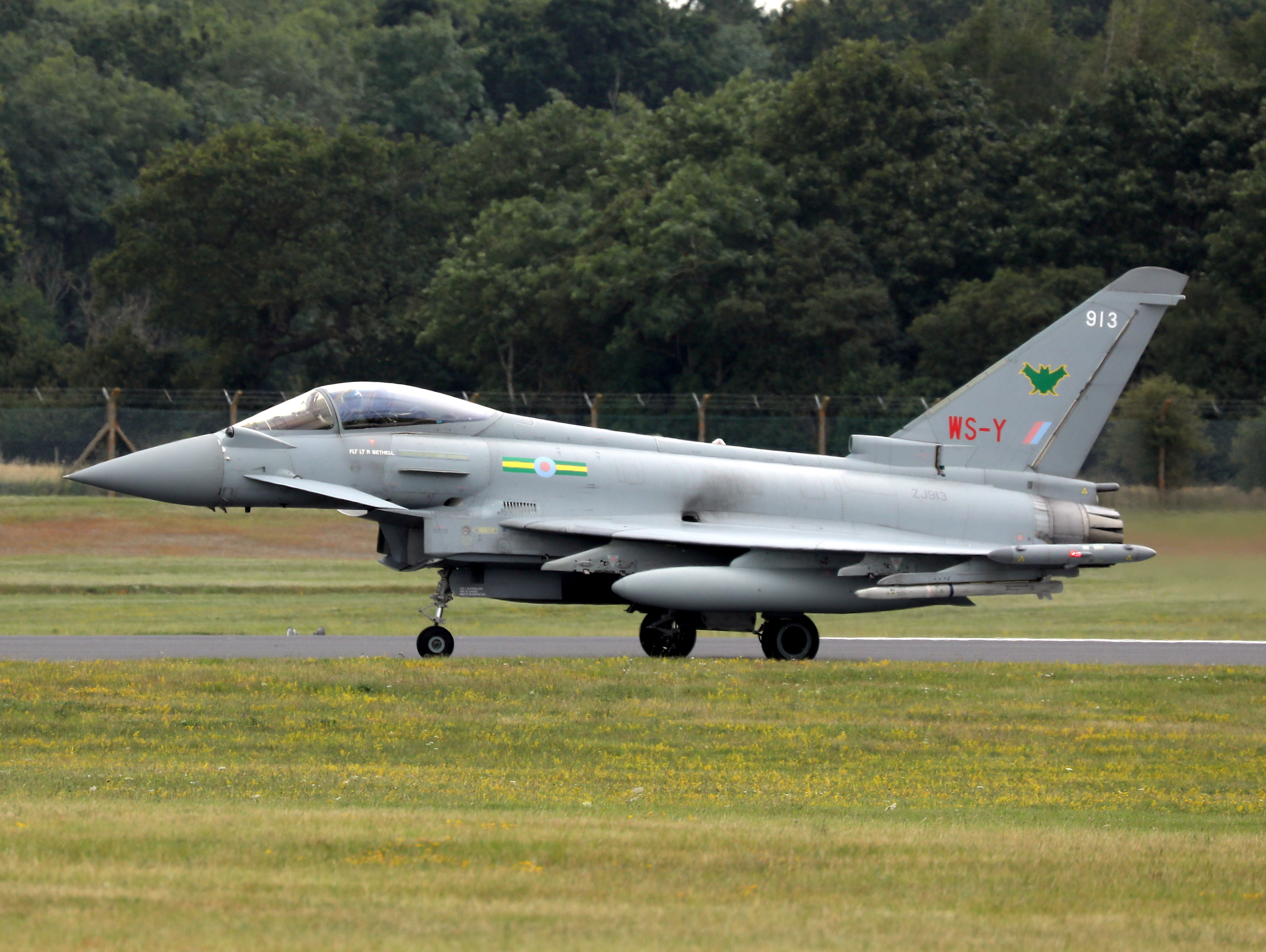
A No. IX (B) Squadron Eurofighter Typhoon FGR.4 at RIAT, 2019.

Four Eurofighter Typhoon FGR4 were assigned to No. IX (B) Squadron (Designate) at RAF Lossiemouth in Moray in February 2019, the first appearing in squadron markings on 13 February. No. IX (B) Squadron re-equipped as an aggressor and air defence squadron operating the Typhoon at 09:31 on 1 April 2019, thereby continuing in unbroken service upon Tornado's retirement. The squadron marked its change of aircraft, role and location with a further parade on 2 May 2019, having formally reformed on 1 April.

On 24 March 2020, due to its participation in Operation Herrick, No. IX (B) Squadron was awarded the battle honour 'Afghanistan 2001–2014' (without the right to emblazon on the squadron standard) by Her Majesty Queen Elizabeth II, To mark the 75th anniversary of VE Day on 8 May 2020, a pair of No. IX (B) Squadron Typhoons performed a flypast over Edinburgh.

On 16 November 2020, the squadron deployed Typhoons to Konya Air Base in Turkey to conduct training alongside locally based General Dynamics F-16 Fighting Falcons. On 23 April 2021, four Typhoons from No. IX (B) Squadron deployed to Mihail Kogălniceanu Air Base, Romania, to carry out enhanced Air Policing on behalf of NATO. In March 2023, No. IX (B) Squadron deployed to Ämari Air Base, Estonia, in support of Operation Azotize, operating in tandem with TLG 71 of the German Air Force.

== Aircraft operated ==
Aircraft operated include:

- Royal Aircraft Factory B.E.2a (December 1914 – February 1915)
- Farman MF.7 (December 1914 – February 1915; April 1915 – November 1915)
- Blériot XI (December 1914 – March 1915; April 1915 – August 1915)
- Farman MF.11 (December 1914 – March 1915)
- Blériot XI Parasol (January 1915 – March 1915)
- Royal Aircraft Factory B.E.2b (January 1915 – February 1915)
- Royal Aircraft Factory B.E.2c (January 1915 – February 1915; August 1915 – October 1916)
- Royal Aircraft Factory B.E.2 (April 1915 – July 1915)
- Royal Aircraft Factory B.E.8a (July 1915 – November 1915)
- Avro 504 (July 1915 – November 1915)
- Martinsyde S.1 (July 1915 – November 1915)
- Royal Aircraft Factory R.E.7 (November 1915)
- Bristol Scout (December 1915 – June 1916)
- Royal Aircraft Factory B.E.2d (June 1916 – September 1916)
- Royal Aircraft Factory B.E.2e (August 1916 – June 1917)
- Royal Aircraft Factory R.E.8 (May 1917 – May 1919)
- Bristol F.2b (July 1918 – October 1918; February 1919 – July 1919)
- Vickers Vimy (April 1924 – October 1925)
- Vickers Virginia Mk.IV (September 1924 – March 1927)
- Vickers Virginia Mk.V (January 1925 – May 1926)
- Vickers Virginia Mk.VI (June 1925 – April 1927)
- Vickers Virginia Mk.VII (July 1926 – June 1930)
- Vickers Virginia Mk.VIII (January 1927 – March 1927)
- Vickers Virginia Mk.IX (July 1927 – February 1932)
- Vickers Virginia Mk.X (January 1929 – April 1936)
- Handley Page Heyford Mk.III (March 1936 – May 1939)
- Vickers Wellington Mk.I (January 1939 – December 1939)
- Vickers Wellington Mk.Ia (September 1939 – September 1940)
- Vickers Wellington Mk.Ic (February 1940 – October 1941; May 1942–Jun 1942)
- Vickers Wellington Mk.II (March 1941 – August 1941)
- Vickers Wellington Mk.III (July 1941 – August 1942)
- Avro Lancaster Mk.I (September 1942 – December 1945; May 1946 – July 1946)
- Avro Lancaster Mk.III (September 1942 – December 1945; May 1946 – July 1946)
- Avro Lancaster Mk.VII (November 1945 – April 1946)
- Avro Lincoln B.2 (July 1946 – May 1952)
- English Electric Canberra B.2 (May 1952 – June 1956)
- English Electric Canberra B.6 (September 1955 – July 1961)
- Avro Vulcan B.2 (April 1962 – April 1982)
- Panavia Tornado GR.1 (January 1982 – 1999)
- Panavia Tornado GR.4 (May 1998 – March 2019)
- Eurofighter Typhoon FGR.4 (February 2019 – present)

== Heritage ==
=== Badge and motto ===
The squadron's badge features a green bat with wings extended, the bat reflecting the squadron's previous night-bombing. The badge was approved by King Edward VIII in November 1936.

The squadron's motto is Per noctem volamus (Latin for 'We fly through the night').

=== Memorials ===
==== Bardney Village Green ====
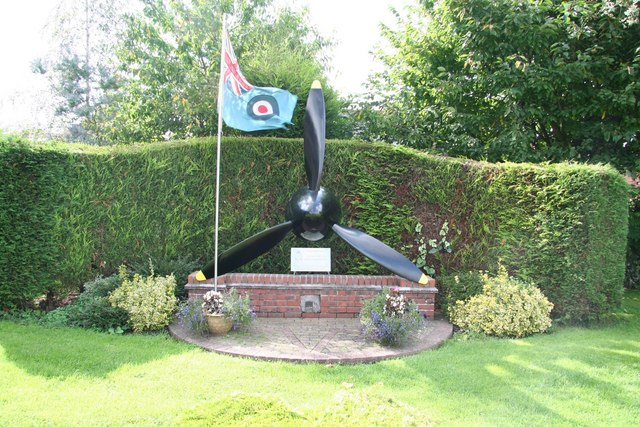
The No. IX (B) Squadron memorial on the village green at Bardney, Lincolnshire

A memorial to members of No. IX (B) Squadron who were killed or went missing during the Second World War is located in the village of Bardney, Lincolnshire. The memorial was unveiled on 19 October 1980 and features an engine propeller from an Avro Lancaster bomber mounted on a brick wall. The wall includes a piece of stone from Norway, reflecting the role of the Norwegian Resistance in the squadron's attack on the Tirpitz.

==== National Memorial Arboretum ====
A memorial to all who have served on No. IX (B) Squadron was unveiled at the National Memorial Arboretum in October 2017. The memorial was designed by John Fox, an honorary member of the IX (B) Squadron Association. It takes the form of an pyramid, constructed from sandstone at its base, polished green granite in the middle and polished brown granite at its peak.

==== St Lawrence Church, Bardney ====
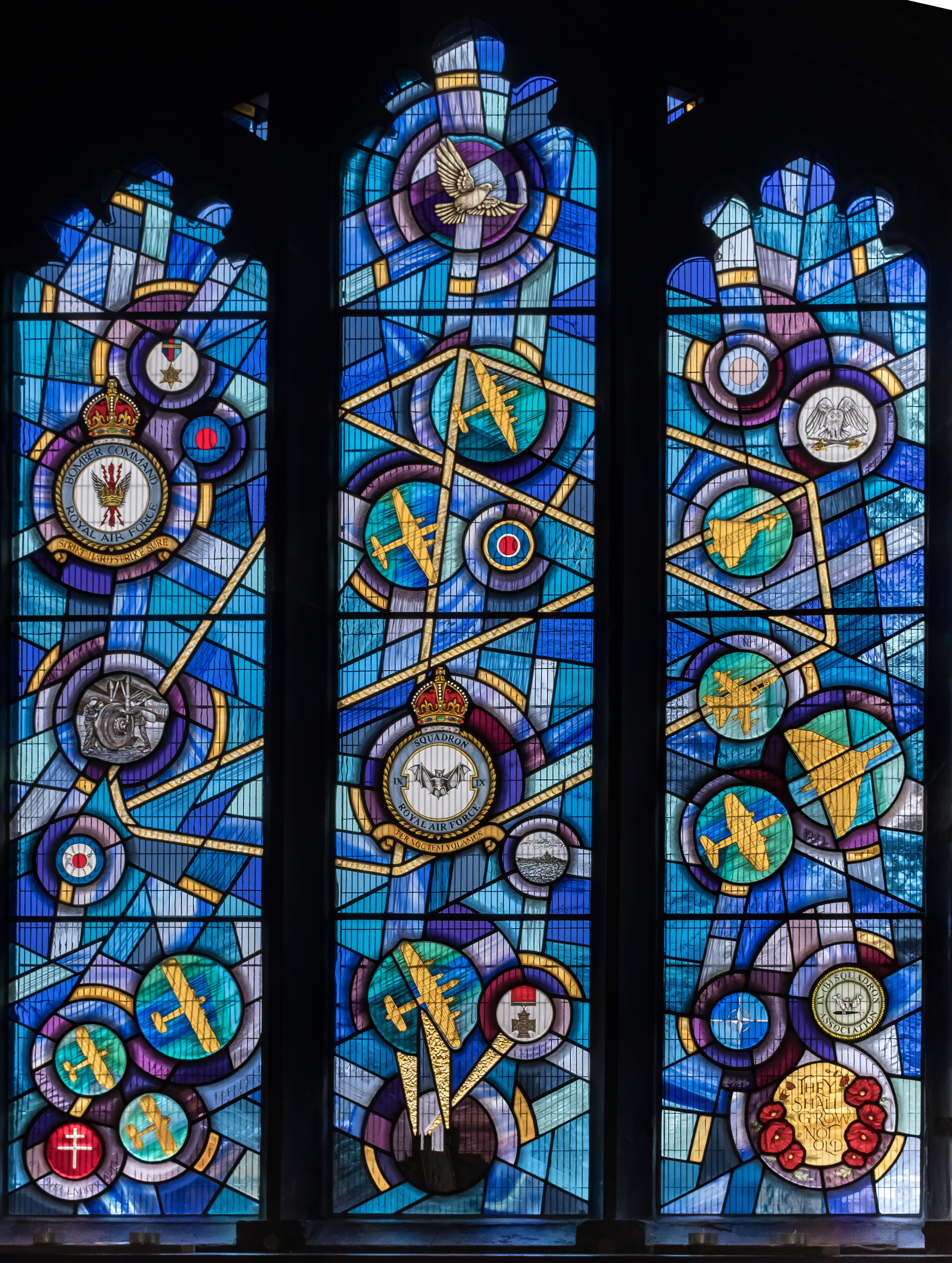
Stained glass window celebrating the history of No. IX (B) Squadron at St Lawrence Church, Bardney.

On 10 November 2024, a three-panelled stained glass window celebrating the history of No. IX (B) Squadron was installed at St Lawrence Church, Bardney. The window was designed by artist Claire Williamson and features a range of aircraft and emblems relating to the squadron's history.

=== Affiliations ===
No. IX (B) Squadron is affiliated to:

- HMS St Albans – Type 23 frigate of the Royal Navy
- the King's Royal Hussars – Royal Armoured Corps regiment of the British Army
- the Worshipful Company of Haberdashers – livery company of the City of London
- No. 9 Squadron of the Pakistan Air Force

=== Call signs ===
As of March 2025, aircraft operated by No. IX (B) Squadron use the following peacetime air traffic control call signs within UK airspace: Aggressor, Barron, Batman, Boris, Dracula, Fang, Ivan, Nightwing, Tirpitz and Vodka.

== Battle honours ==
No. IX (B) Squadron has received the following battle honours. Those marked with an asterisk (*) may be emblazoned on the squadron standard.

- Western Front (1915–1918)*
- Somme (1916)*
- Ypres (1917)*
- Amiens
- Hindenburg Line
- Channel & North Sea (1939–1945)
- Norway (1940)
- Baltic (1939–1945)
- France & Low Countries (1940)
- German Ports (1940–1945)
- Fortress Europe (1940–1944)*
- Berlin (1941–45)*
- Biscay Ports (1940–1945)
- Ruhr (1941–1945)
- France & Germany (1944–1945)
- Tirpitz*
- The Dams*
- Rhine
- Gulf (1991)*
- Kosovo*
- Afghanistan (2001–2014)
- Iraq (2003)*
- Iraq (2003–2011)
- Libya (2011)*

== See also ==
- List of RAF squadrons
- Armed forces in Scotland
- Military history of Scotland
