= Handley Page Heyford =

British heavy night bomber aircraft

HP.50 Heyford
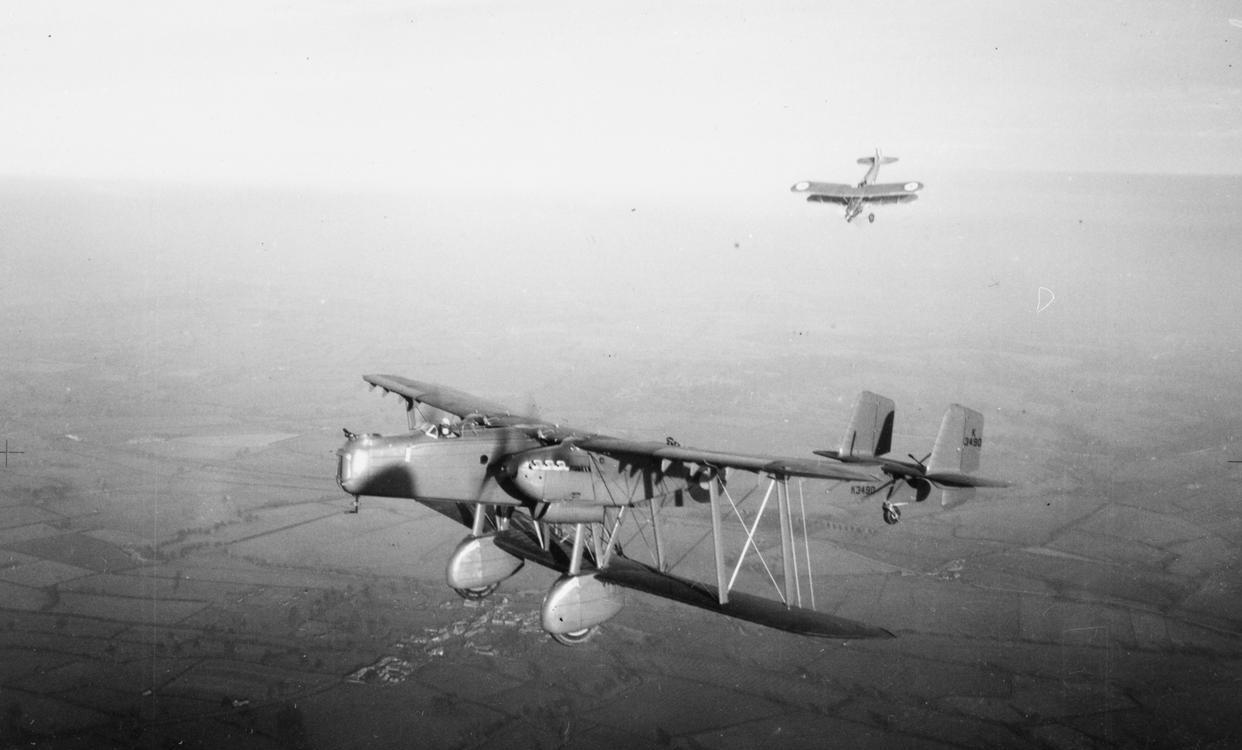

General information
- Type: Heavy night bomber
- National origin: United Kingdom
- Manufacturer: Handley Page
- Designer: George Volkert
- Primary user: Royal Air Force
- Number built: 125

History
- Manufactured: 1933 – 1936
- Introduction date: 1934
- First flight: 12 June 1930
- Retired: 1941

The Handley Page Heyford was a twin-engine biplane bomber designed and produced by the British aircraft manufacturer Handley Page. It holds the distinction of being the last biplane heavy bomber to be operated by the Royal Air Force (RAF).

The Heyford was developed in response to Specification B.19/27 for a new heavy night bomber. Much of the design can be attributed to the work of George Volkert, Handley Page's lead designer. Unlike the company's preceding aircraft, the Heyford comprised metal construction instead of wood; it also had an unorthodox arrangement wherein the fuselage was joined to the upper wing rather than the lower one, which gave the aircraft a relatively nose-high orientation while on the ground. Considerable revision of the proposal occurred even after its submission, which was recognised as the Air Ministry's preferred option. A sole prototype, designated Handley Page HP.38, was produced, performing its maiden flight on 12 June 1930 and commencing service trials shortly thereafter.

During November 1933, the first Heyfords entered service, being initially flown by No. 99 Squadron at RAF Upper Heyford; before the end of 1936, Bomber Command had a total of nine operational squadrons equipped with the Heyford. Despite forming a considerable portion of the RAF's bomber fleet during the mid-1930s, the Heyford had a relatively short service life as it was rapidly eclipsed by a new generation of monoplane bombers, such as the Armstrong Whitworth Whitley and the Vickers Wellington. The replacement of the type had commenced during 1937 as more capable bombers were introduced during a major rearmament push for the RAF; the Heyford was formally declared obsolete in July 1939, barely two months prior to the outbreak of the Second World War. Despite this, the type continued to be used in secondary roles, being used as glider tugs, experimental aircraft, and trainers, into the 1940s.

== Development ==
=== Background ===
By 1928, the Air Staff had concluded that, while one single airframe could be suitably versatile to meet the majority of its needs, a dedicated night-time bomber was required. In response, the Air Ministry issued Specification B.19/27, which sought a heavy bomber for nighttime operations to replace the Vickers Virginia. The requirements listed included the use of a twin-engine arrangement, positive stability, ease of maintenance, good manoeuvrability, avoidance of excessive pilot fatigue, an adequate self-defense capability, sufficient carrying capacity for up to 1,546 lb (700 kg) of bombs, and to traverse a distance of 920 miles at a speed of at least 115 mph (185 km/h). The release of the specification was met with a large number of proposals from various companies across the British aircraft industry. Specifically, designs were submitted by Fairey (the Fairey Hendon) and Vickers (the Type 150 and Type 163 being built) in addition to Handley Page's own proposal.

The responsibility for producing Handley Page's design was given to the company's lead designer G. R. Volkert. According to aviation author C. H. Barnes, while Handley Page was satisfied with the qualities of wooden construction, it was the Air Ministry's insistence that all future production aircraft use metal construction that compelled the firm to change. A new recruit to the company, Raymond Sandifer, played a crucial role in this substitution process, which included steel tubing and aluminium fuel tanks. The design produced by Volkert pursued aerodynamic optimisation to achieve its performance, particularly for the uninterrupted upper wing surface and had deliberately limited the wing span to 75 feet to avoid any need for folding arrangements. According to Barnes, at the time of its submission on 16 November 1927, Handley Page's proposal was quite original.

Further changes to the proposed design were made over the following months, often involving its propulsion in particular. Multiple engines, including the Napier Lion, Rolls-Royce Kestrel inline engines and Bristol Jupiter radial engines, were considered by Handley Page, before it was determined that the Kestrel was superior. Furthermore, while variable-pitch propellers had been considered, they were ultimately excluded in favour of fixed-pitch counterparts due to synchronisation issues. Other changes included an alternative undercarriage configuration that produced less drag, adjusted wing stagger, and revisions to the positioning of the fuselage.

=== Prototype ===
A single prototype, designated Handley Page HP.38, was ordered under contract No.790320/27, which was subsequently amended under contract No.819857/28. The prototype was completed during May 1930; it was powered by a pair of Rolls-Royce Kestrel II engines, each capable of producing up to 525 hp (390 kW), that drove a set of two-bladed propellers. On 12 June 1930, this prototype performed its maiden flight from Handley Page's factory at Radlett. Following the completion of contractor testing, the HP.38 was dispatched to Martlesham Heath to undergo service trials; further tests were conducted with No. 10 Squadron. Numerous improvements and changes were suggested by test pilots and reviewing officials alike, including enlarged radiators, thicker skin, and a revised cockpit design. The prototype crashed and burned at North Coates bombing range during comparative testing.

Handley Page were under pressure to proceed rapidly, partially due to competition from the Vickers Type 150 and the Fairey Long-range Monoplane; the prototypes of both these rivals suffered separate accidents, which gave extra time to refine the HP.38. Revisions around this time largely focused on increasing the workspace for crewmembers and the clearance for groundcrews to arm the aircraft. On 11 April 1932, revisions to the prototype's monocoque fuselage to incorporate all of the recommended improvements were authorised. As a consequence of the talk at the League of Nations of abolishing bombing, military planners opted to delay the awarding of a production contract; at one point, Handley Page was considering laying off numerous staff involved with the HP.38 over this uncertainty. However, the Japanese invasion of Manchuria and a lack of consensus among the Geneva Disarmament Committee led to the Air Ministry issuing instructions to proceed with an initial batch of five aircraft, designated "HP.50 Heyford".

During March 1933, production contract 25498/33 was issued to Handley Page, ordering 15 HP.50s. The first of these aircraft was assembled by hand, partially due to the need for it as a prototype after the loss of the HP.38 in an accident. The production aircraft differed somewhat from the earlier prototype, the Heyford I was fitted with 575 hp (429 kW) Kestrel III engines and retained the two-blade propellers, while the improved Heyford IA had four-blade propellers. Engine variations were primary differences for both the Mk II and III variants; the former being equipped with 640 hp (480 kW) Kestrel IVs, supercharged to 695 hp (518 kW) in the Heyford III.

== Design ==
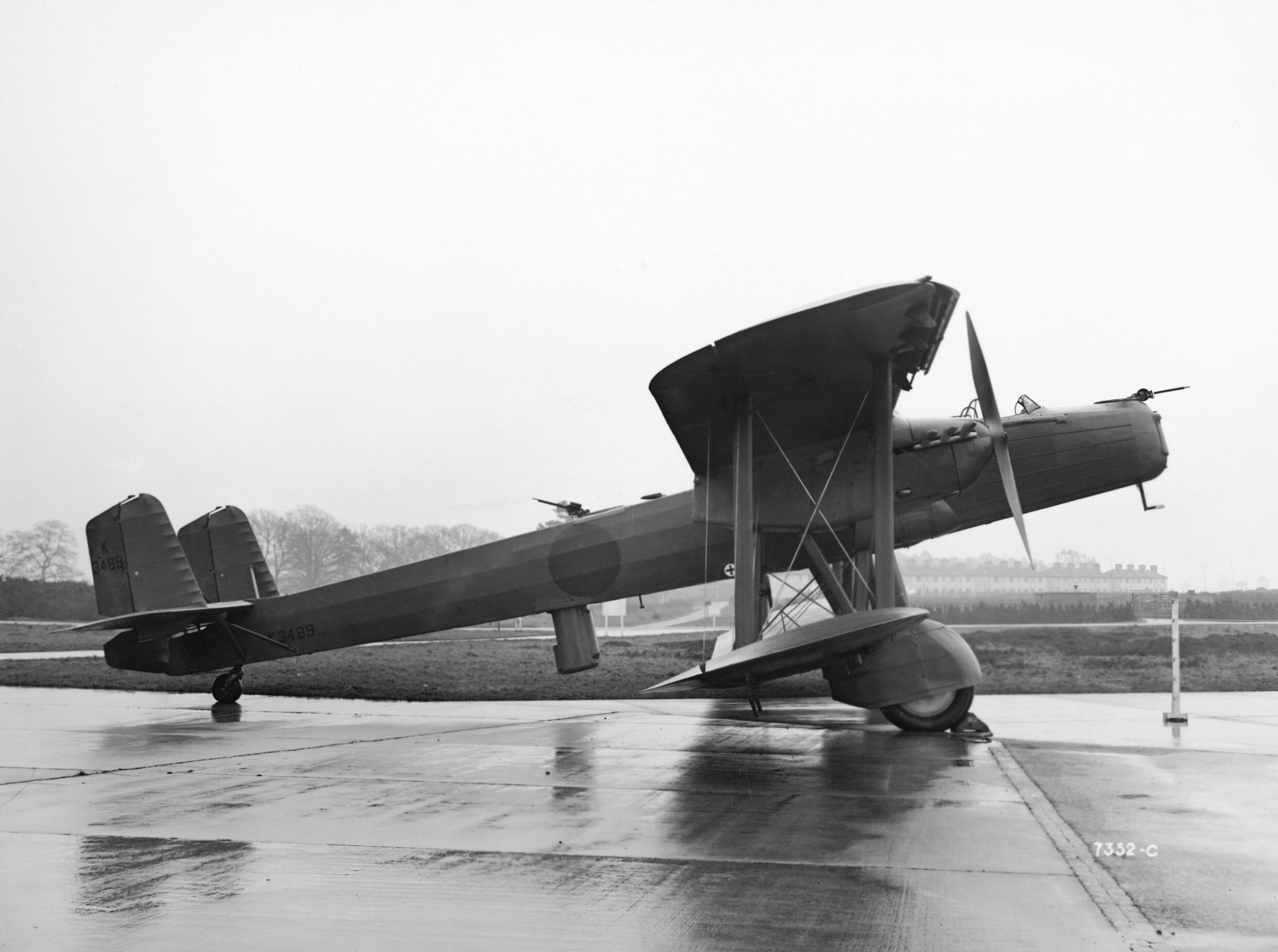
Side-on view of a Heyford. The "dustbin" turret can be seen extended just behind the aft portion of the lower wing.

The Handley Page Heyford was a twin-engine biplane bomber designed for nighttime operations. It featured a relatively novel configuration in which the fuselage was attached to the upper wing – somewhat resembling the 1914-designed German Gotha G.I. This arrangement provided a favourable field of fire for its defensive weapons, which were positioned on the nose and dorsal sections, along with the ventral retractable "dustbin" turret, each of which were armed with a single .303 in (7.7 mm) Lewis light machine gun. The wings of the Heyford were equal in both span and dihedral. The lower wing featured a thickened center section to accommodate the aircraft's single bomb bay. Automated wing tip slots improved the take-off performance considerably. Propulsion consisted of a pair of Rolls-Royce Kestrel engines, which each drove a set of fixed-pitch propellers.

The Heyford featured a mixed construction; its wings were covered by fabric while the structure comprised a twin-bay metal frame, while the fuselage consisted of an aluminium monocoque forward section with a fabric-covered frame to the rear. It was operated by a crew of four, typically consisting of a pilot, a bomb aimer/navigator/gunner, a radio operator and a dorsal/ventral gunner. Open positions were provided for the pilot and both the nose and dorsal gunners. The Heyford was furnished with a fixed undercarriage that consisted of large, spat-covered wheels that were mounted at the leading edge of the lower wing. This arrangement enabled ground crews to safely attach bombs even as the engines were still running, but also had the consequence of positioning the pilot roughly 17 ft (5 m) above the ground. Another benefit of this nose-high angle was a relatively short and speedy take-off run.

== Operational history ==
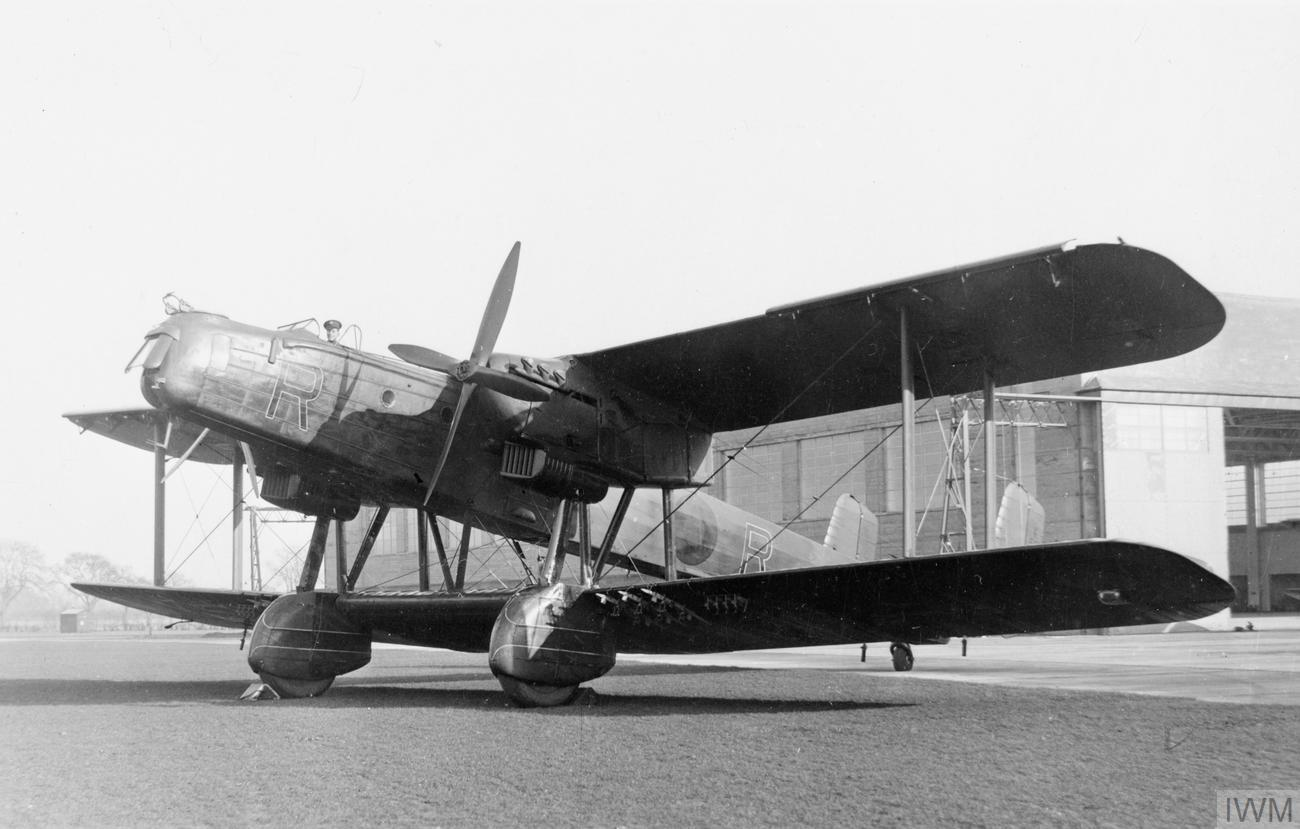
A Heyford of No. 102 Squadron at RAF Honington, 1938

In November 1933, the Heyford I entered service with No. 99 Squadron, at RAF Upper Heyford, near Bicester in Oxfordshire. It was subsequently adopted by No. 10 Squadron and No. 7 Squadron, which re-equipped with the Heyford IA and II in August 1934 and April 1935 respectively. As part of the RAF's expansion plan, follow-on orders were placed for 70 Heyford IIIs during 1936, which were equipped with steam condenser-cooled Rolls-Royce Kestrel VI engines. The delivery of these aircraft enabled the RAF to have nine operational squadrons equipped with Heyfords by the end of 1936.

During the late 1930s, these Heyford squadrons comprised a significant proportion of Bomber Command's night bomber strength. Accordingly, Heyfords commonly flew lengthy nighttime exercises, sometimes conducting mock attacks against targets in France. On 12 December 1936, disaster struck one of these long-range exercises; a flight of seven Heyfords of No. 102 Squadron, returning for Northern Ireland encountered fog and icy weather conditions on their approach to RAF Finningley, Yorkshire. Of these seven aircraft, four crashed and two had to make forced landings, resulting in the deaths of three crewmen and a further three sustaining injuries.

During 1937, the replacement of the Heyford commenced, coinciding with the arrival into service of the Armstrong Whitworth Whitley and Vickers Wellesley. The last examples were withdrawn from frontline service during 1939. Several Heyfords continued to be used for secondary duties, being commonly used as bombing and gunnery trainers, into the 1940s, although the Heyford had been officially declared to be obsolete during July 1939. A pair were still being used as glider tugs until April 1941. There are at least three fatalities associated with the Heyford in the Second World War, these occurring due to a mid-air collision between two aircraft on 4 April 1940. At least two examples found experimental use; one for airborne radar and the other for aerial refuelling, and it is reported that a single Heyford was still in storage as late as 1944.

== Variants ==
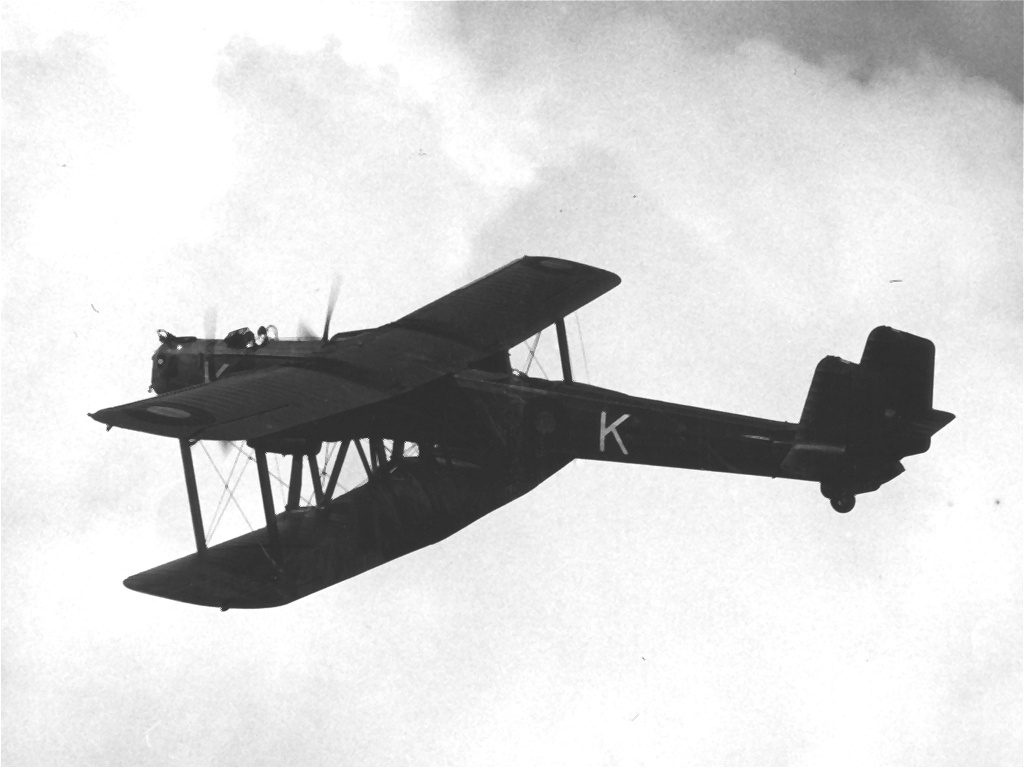
A Heyford in flight, circa 1938

H.P.38
Single prototype powered by two Rolls-Royce F.XIV engines and flown in June 1930.

H.P.50 Heyford I
Powered by 575 hp (429 kW) Rolls-Royce Kestrel III engines: 15 built, serial numbers K3489-K3902 (last aircraft built as Mk.II prototype).

H.P.50 Heyford IA
Engine support changes, power-driven generator, four-blade propellers: 23 built, serial numbers K4021-K4043.

H.P.50 Heyford II
Powered by 640 hp (480 kW) Kestrel IV engines: 16 built, serial numbers K4863-K4878.

H.P.50 Heyford III
Supercharged 695 hp (518 kW) Kestrel VI engines: 70 built in two batches, serial numbers K5180-K5199 and K6857-K6906.

For a total of 125 (including the prototype, J9130)

== Operators ==
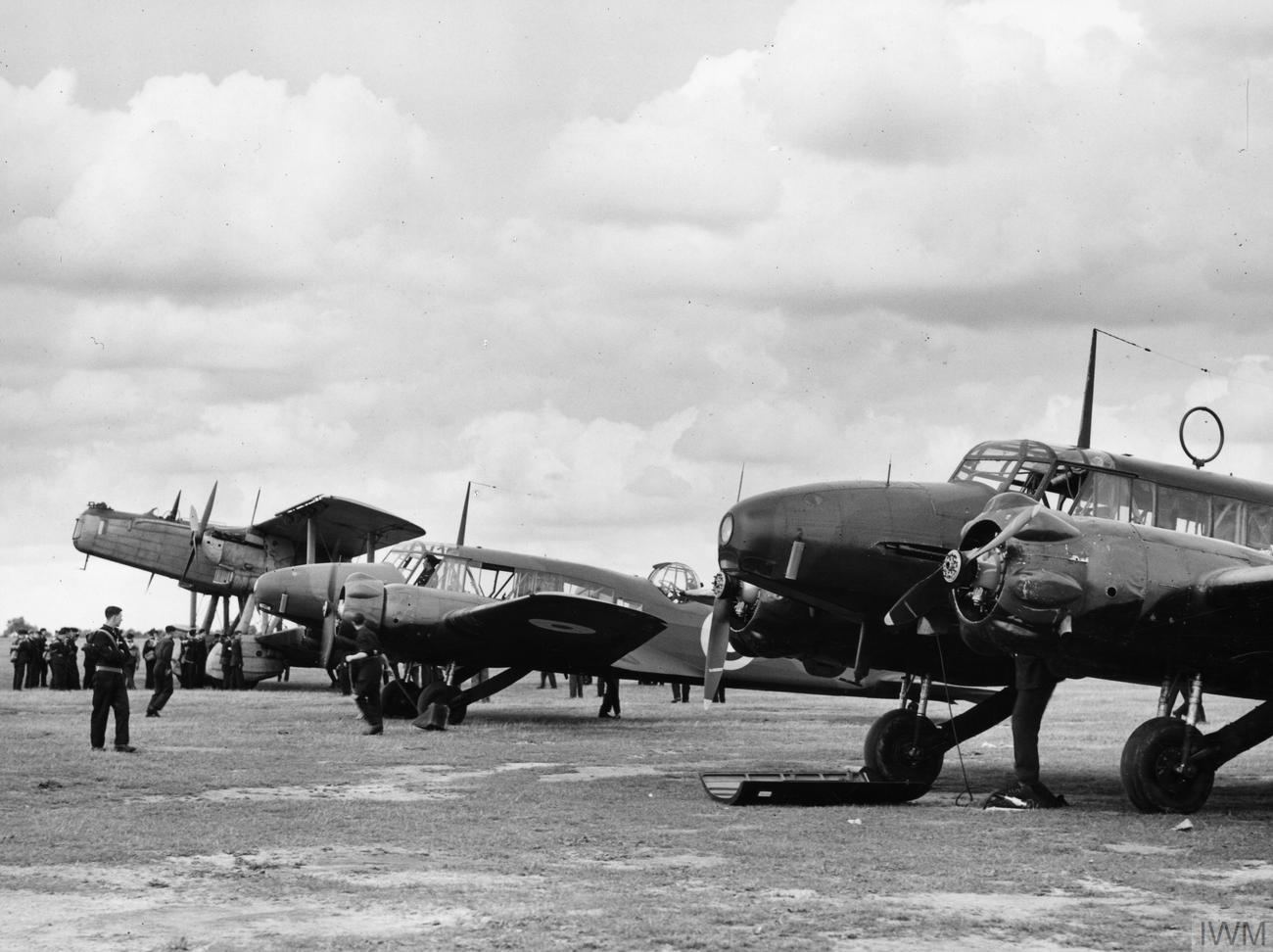
A Heyford alongside a pair of Avro Ansons, 28 July 1940

United Kingdom

- Royal Air Force
  - No. 7 Squadron
  - No. 9 Squadron
  - No. 10 Squadron
  - No. 38 Squadron
  - No. 58 Squadron
  - No. 78 Squadron
  - No. 97 Squadron
  - No. 99 Squadron
  - No. 102 Squadron
  - No. 148 Squadron
  - No. 149 Squadron
  - No. 166 Squadron

== Survivors ==
No intact Heyfords, or significant portions from a single one, have survived through to preservation. The Royal Air Force Museum has several components of the Heyford on display; these include a pair of main wheels, two blades of a Heyford propeller and tailplane parts of Heyford III K6875 of No. 166 Squadron, recovered from its crash site in the Peak District.

== Specifications (Heyford IA) ==
Data from Aircraft of the Royal Air Force 1918–57

General characteristics

- Crew: 4 (pilot, co-pilot/navigator, bomb aimer/air gunner, wireless operator/air gunner)
- Length: 58 ft (18 m)
- Wingspan: 75 ft (23 m)
- Height: 17 ft 6 in (5.33 m)
- Wing area: 1,470 sq ft (137 m^{2})
- Empty weight: 9,200 lb (4,173 kg)
- Gross weight: 16,900 lb (7,666 kg)
- Powerplant: 2 × Rolls-Royce Kestrel II-S V-12 liquid-cooled piston engines, 525 hp (391 kW) each
- Propellers: 4-bladed fixed-pitch propellers

Performance

- Maximum speed: 142 mph (229 km/h, 123 kn) at 13,000 ft (3,962 m)
- Range: 920 mi (1,480 km, 800 nmi)
- Service ceiling: 21,000 ft (6,400 m)
- Time to altitude: 10,000 ft (3,048 m) in 15 minutes 18 seconds

Armament

- Guns: 3 × .303 in (7.7 mm) Lewis guns (nose, dorsal and ventral 'dustbin' positions)
- Bombs: 2,500 lb (1,134 kg) total

== See also ==
- Avro 613 – an unbuilt competitor for the B.19/27 requirement

Related lists

- List of aircraft of the Royal Air Force
- List of bomber aircraft
