= Fairey Hendon =

British heavy bomber

Hendon
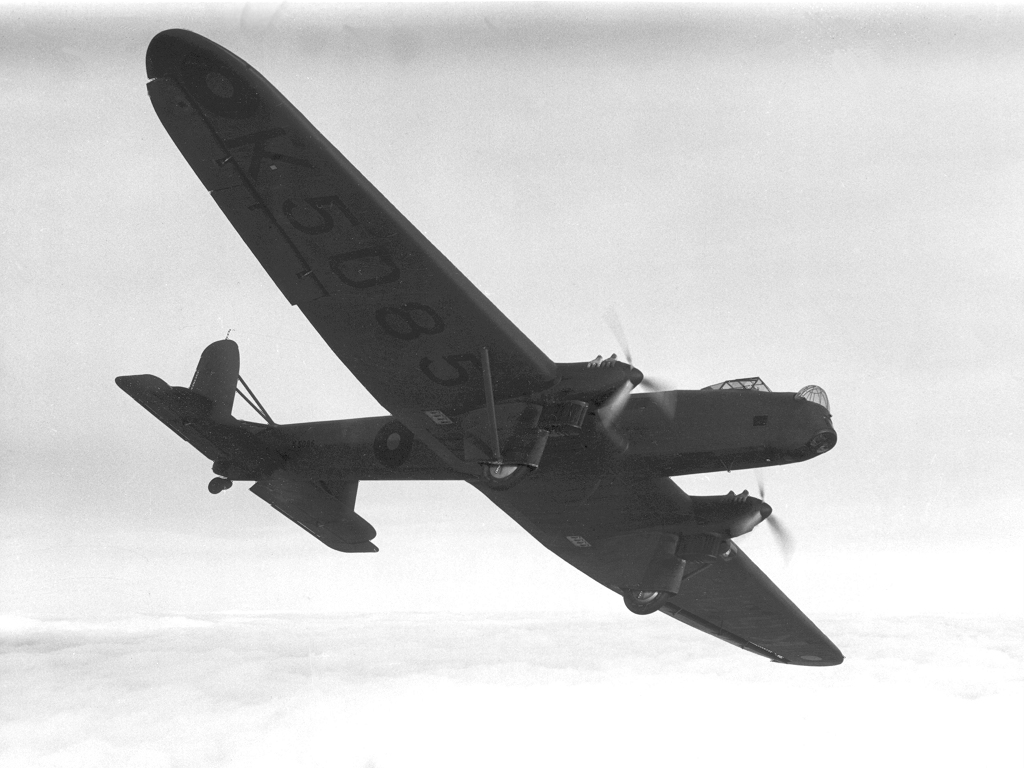
- A Fairey Hendon

General information
- Type: Heavy night bomber
- National origin: United Kingdom
- Manufacturer: Fairey Aviation
- Primary user: Royal Air Force
- Number built: 15

History
- Manufactured: 1936–1937
- Introduction date: 1936
- First flight: 25 November 1930
- Retired: January 1939

The Fairey Hendon was a British monoplane, heavy bomber of the Royal Air Force, designed by Fairey Aviation, and first flown in 1930. The aircraft served in small numbers with one squadron of the RAF between 1936 and 1939. It was the first all-metal construction low-wing monoplane to enter service with the RAF.

== Development ==
The Hendon was built to meet the Air Ministry Specification B.19/27 for a twin-engine night bomber to replace the Vickers Virginia, competing against the Handley Page Heyford and Vickers Type 150. The specification required a range of 920 mi (1,480 km) at a speed of 115 mph (185 km/h), with a bomb load of 1,500 lb (680 kg). To meet this requirement, Fairey designed a low-winged cantilever monoplane with a fixed tailwheel undercarriage. The fuselage had a steel tube structure with fabric covering with a pilot, a radio operator/navigator and three gunners, in open nose, dorsal and tail positions. Bombs were carried in ten large and six smaller bomb cells in the fuselage and wing centre section between the engines. Variants powered by either radial engines or liquid-cooled V12 engines were proposed.

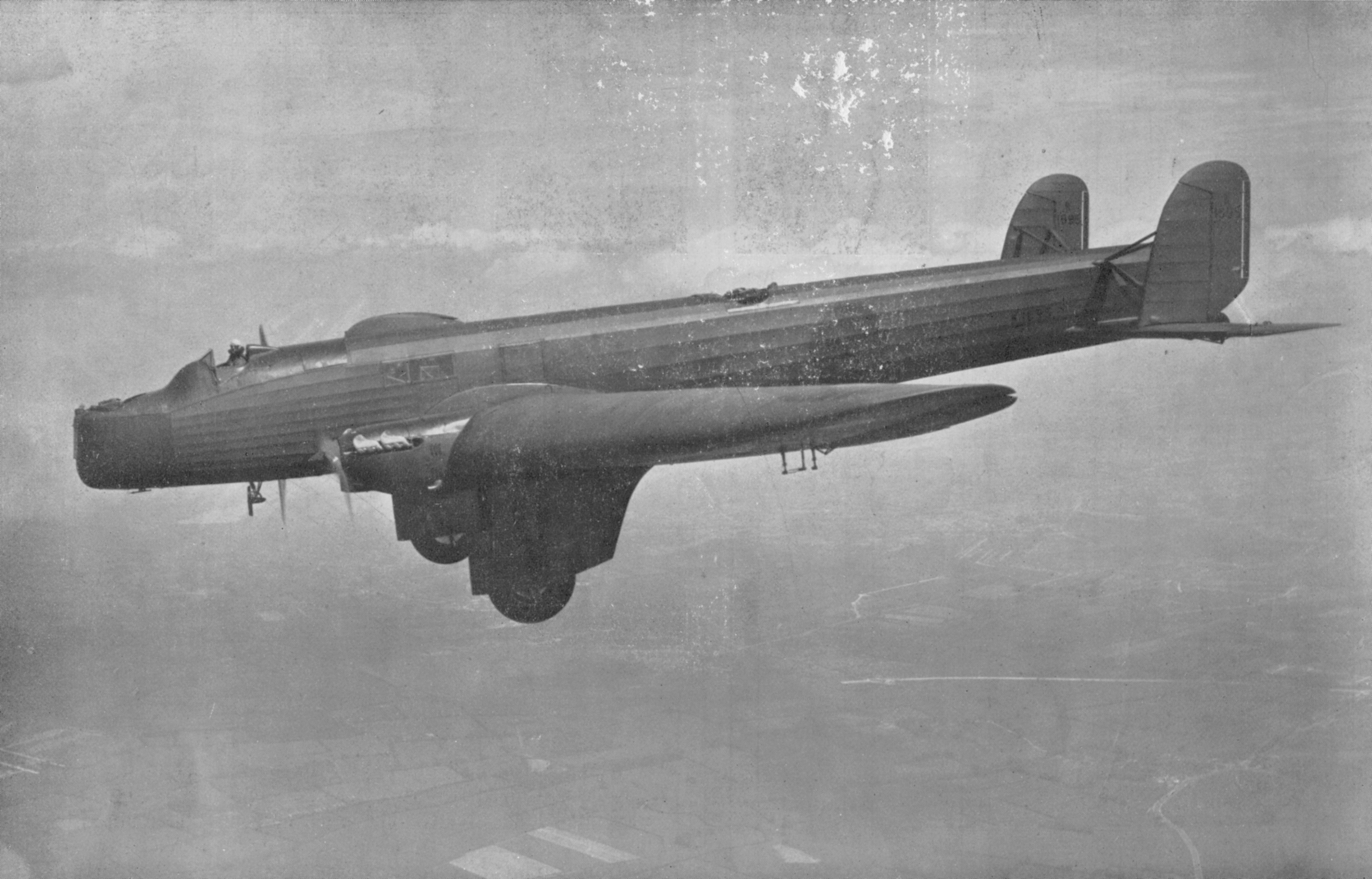
The prototype K1695 with two Rolls-Royce Kestrel 600 HP engines.

The prototype K1695 (which was known as the Fairey Night Bomber until 1934) first flew on 25 November 1930, from Fairey's Great West Aerodrome in Heathrow and was powered by two 460 hp (340 kW) Bristol Jupiter VIII radial engines. The prototype crashed and was severely damaged in March 1931 and was rebuilt with two Rolls-Royce Kestrel VI engines. After trials, 14 production examples named the Hendon Mk.II were ordered. These were built by Fairey's Stockport factory in late 1936 and early 1937 and flown from Barton Aerodrome, Manchester. Orders for a further sixty Hendons were cancelled in 1936, as the prototype of the first of the next generation of British heavy bombers—the Armstrong Whitworth Whitley—had flown and showed much higher performance. The Hendon Mk.II was powered by two Rolls-Royce Kestrel VI engines. The production Hendon Mk.II had an enclosed cockpit for the pilot and navigator.

== Operational history ==
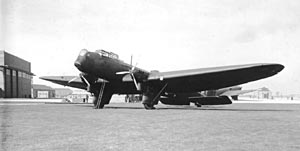
A Fairey Hendon of no. 38 Squadron

The type was delayed by the crash and a rebuild of the prototype and the Heyford received the majority of the orders to replace RAF heavy bombers. This was despite the Heyford crashing and burning at North Coates bombing range during comparative testing. The Hendon coming into service three years after the Heyford.

The only Hendon-equipped unit, 38 Squadron, began operational service at RAF Mildenhall in November 1936, replacing Heyfords, later moving to RAF Marham, Norfolk. Later, the Hendons went to 115 Squadron, which was formed from 38 Squadron. The type was soon obsolete and replaced from late 1938 by the Vickers Wellington. By January 1939, the Hendons had been retired and were then used for ground instruction work, including the radio school at RAF Cranwell.

== Variants ==
Hendon Mk.I
Prototype, one built
Hendon Mk.II
Production variant with two Rolls-Royce Kestrel VI engines, 14 built

== Operators ==
- Royal Air Force
  - No. 38 Squadron RAF
  - No. 115 Squadron RAF
  - No. 1 Electrical & Wireless School RAF

== Accidents and incidents ==
Of the 14 Hendon IIs only two were lost in accidents:

- December 1937 - K5091 crashed on landing at RAF Marham
- November 1938 - K5095 crashed at RAF Marham. This accident occurred when two Leading aircraftmen, neither of whom had any flying training, took the aircraft without permission and stalled the aircraft at 150 ft (50 m).

== Specifications (Hendon II) ==
Data from The British Bomber since 1914; Fairey Aircraft since 1915

General characteristics

- Crew: 5
- Length: 60 ft 9 in (18.52 m)
- Wingspan: 101 ft 9 in (31.02 m)
- Height: 18 ft 8 in (5.69 m)
- Wing area: 1,146 sq ft (106.5 m^{2})
- Empty weight: 12,773 lb (5,794 kg)
- Gross weight: 20,000 lb (9,072 kg)
- Powerplant: 2 × Rolls-Royce Kestrel VI V-12 water-cooled piston engines, 600 hp (450 kW) each
- Propellers: 2-bladed fixed-pitch propellers

Performance

- Maximum speed: 152 mph (245 km/h, 132 kn) at 15,000 ft (4,600 m)
- Cruise speed: 133 mph (214 km/h, 116 kn) at 15,000 ft (4,600 m)
- Range: 1,360 mi (2,190 km, 1,180 nmi)
- Service ceiling: 21,400 ft (6,500 m)
- Rate of climb: 940 ft/min (4.8 m/s)
- Time to altitude: 6,500 ft (2,000 m) in 9 minutes 12 seconds
- Wing loading: 17.5 lb/sq ft (85 kg/m^{2})
- Power/mass: 0.06 hp/lb (0.10 kW/kg)

Armament

- Guns: 3 × .303 in (7.7 mm) Lewis guns in nose, dorsal and tail positions
- Bombs: 1,660 lb (753 kg) bombs

== See also ==
- Avro 613 - an unbuilt competitor for the B.19/27 requirement

Aircraft of comparable role, configuration, and era

- Handley Page Heyford
- Tupolev TB-3

Related lists

- List of aircraft of the Royal Air Force
