= Tony Bethell =

British soldier (1922–2004)

R. Anthony Bethell
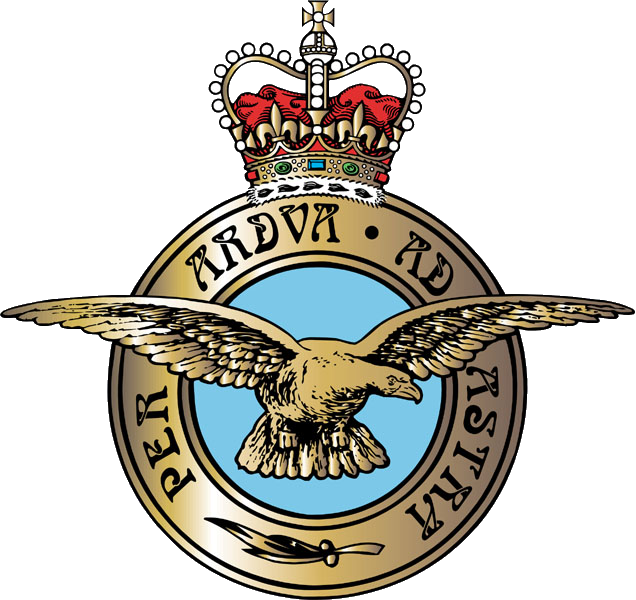
- Born: 9 April 1922; Dar-es-Salaam, Tanganyika Territory
- Died: 17 February 2004 (aged 81); Canada
- Burial place: Metis-sur-Mer, Quebec
- Spouse: Lorna Bethell
- Military career
- Allegiance: United Kingdom
- Branch: Royal Air Force
- Service years: 1941–1945, 1949–1955
- Rank: Flight lieutenant
- Nickname: "Tony"
- Service number: 120413
- Units: No. 268 Squadron; No. 16 Squadron; No. 145 Squadron
- Conflicts: Second World War: European theatre; Channel front (POW); Cold War
- Known for: One of the "Great Escapers"

Richard Anthony Bethell (9 April 1922 – 17 February 2004) was born in Dar es Salaam in the British territory of Tanganyika. He joined the Royal Air Force during the Second World War. After his Mustang was shot down he was taken prisoner and held in the German prisoner of war camp Stalag Luft III at Sagan where he participated in the Great Escape, being one of the 76 officers to break out and make some distance across enemy occupied territory before being recaptured. His name was not one of the 50 who were picked to be executed and he, with 25 others, went back into captivity. He retired from the RAF in 1955 and worked in financial services in Canada. He died in Canada in 2004.

== Early life ==
Bethell's parents lived abroad serving with the British Colonial Services in East Africa and Gibraltar. Bethell was born on 9 April 1922 in Dar-es-Salaam, then part of the British territory of Tanganyika. He and his brother were boarders at Junior Kings School, Sturry, Kent and regularly sailed to Gibraltar to see their parents during school holidays. The Bethell family lived for some years in Gibraltar where his father was state treasurer, and only returned to England after his death. Bethell's education was completed at Sherborne School, where he attained the position of head boy.

== Service career ==
Joining the Royal Air Force as an aircraftman 2nd class (service number 1314695) in February 1941, he completed pilot training in the United States in Georgia, Alabama and Florida. From there he was posted to a training unit at Hawarden, Wales before joining No. 268 (Fighter) Squadron as a sergeant-pilot. He was commissioned as a pilot officer on 7 February 1942 with the RAF officer's service number 120413 and was promoted to flying officer on 1 October 1942.

Equipped with the North American P-51 Mustang, 268 Squadron flew "rhubarbs" (low level sweeps) to attack enemy shipping off the Dutch coast and ground targets such as troop transports and military railway freight. On 26 November 1942, during a mission over the Netherlands he shot down a Messerschmitt Bf 109 near Elburg and minutes later a Junkers Ju 52 transport aircraft near Oldebroek. These were stated in his obituary to be the squadron's first successes and the first of hundreds to fall to Mustangs during the war.

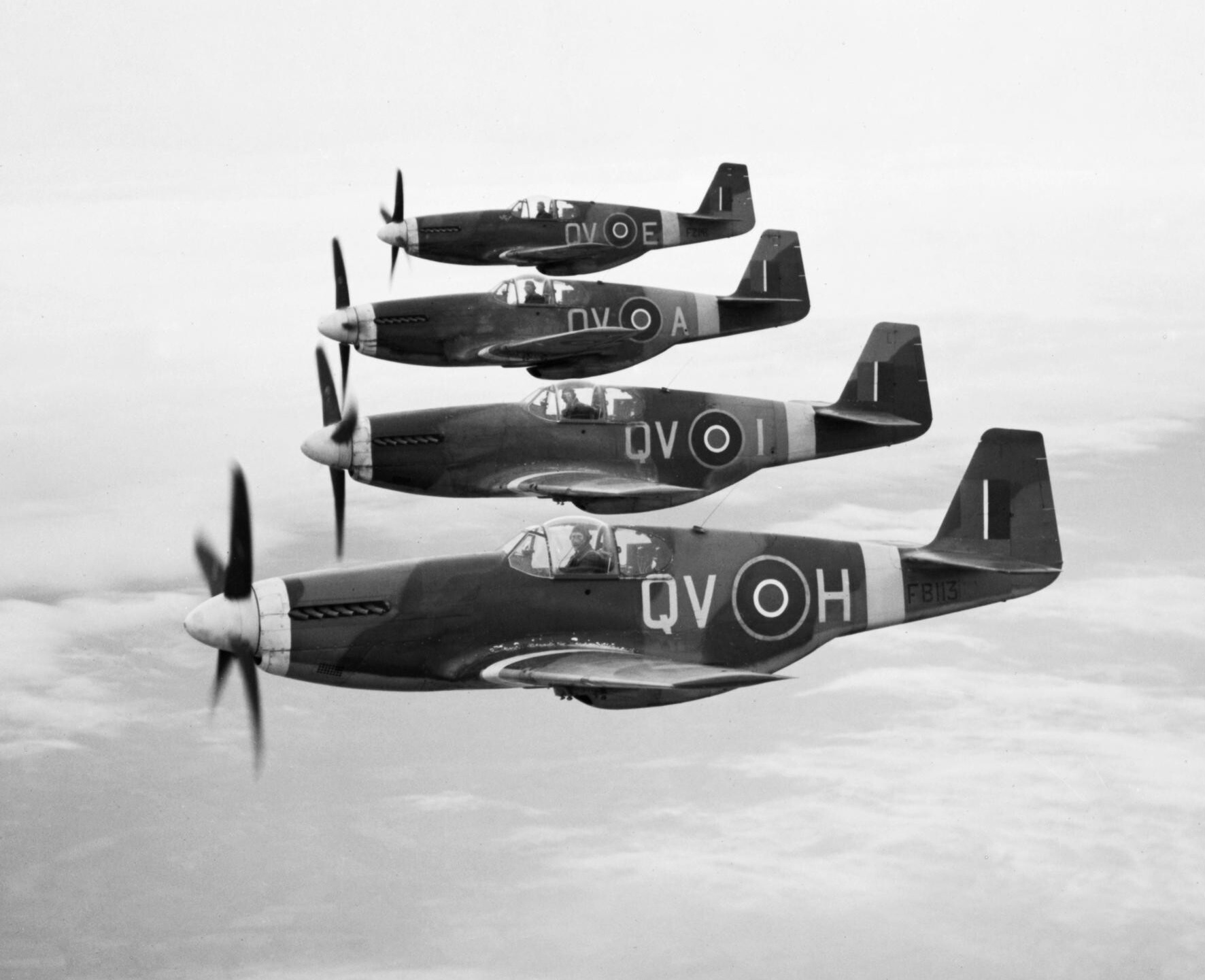
Mustangs in RAF service.

== Capture ==
On 7 December 1942 Bethell was a member of a flight flying a low-level ground attack mission in the Alkmaar area of the Netherlands when his Mustang “V for Victor” (serial number AP212) was hit by light anti-aircraft fire while only 20 feet off the ground. He crash landed and tried to evade German infantrymen searching for him by hiding in a dyke but was captured. Following interrogation at Dulag Luft he was sent to prison camp Stalag Luft III at Sagan. During his time in captivity he was promoted flight lieutenant on 7 February 1944.

== The Great Escape ==
Bethell participated in "the Great Escape" from Stalag Luft III, he was actively involved in tunneling and hauling away the soil, to build the tunnel in which 200 men were to slip through a tunnel code named "Harry", which ran 28 feet (8.5 m) below the ground and 365 feet (111 m) outwards. Due to a calculation error, it surfaced just short of the tree-line which was supposed to give cover to the escapers. The 77th escaper was spotted by a guard around 5am and the alarm sounded. Bethell's position during the escape was initially at "Leicester Square", the second staging point along the tunnel's length. His role was to pull 20 men through until relieved by escaper number 65 and then escape himself and take cover in the woods to await the next nine men before making good his escape.

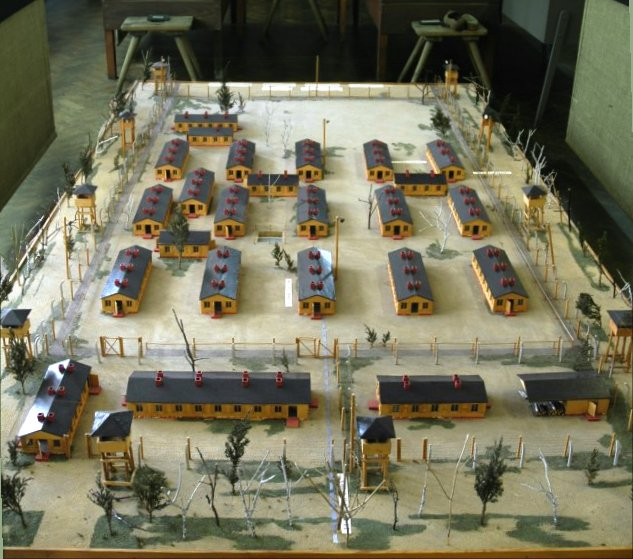
Model of Stalag Luft III prison camp.

After pulling out 12 men, Bethell had to sit in his cramped underground space for 45 minutes until the next man arrived and explained that someone had got stuck and had to be pulled back and the tunnel repaired. Shortly after Bethell's group had cleared the tunnel into the woods there was a shot signalling that the escape had been discovered. They broke into twos and Bethell joined Les Long known to all as "Cookie", hoping to cross the Czech border about 40 miles distant. Snow and flooding forced them to alter their route toward Frankfurt an der Oder where they hoped to hop on a freight train and escape to Sweden. They walked along a railway line, slept in a barn at night then started to travel in daylight but were captured at Bernau. Long and Bethell were held in the Gestapo prison at Görlitz until Long was taken away and shot. Bethell was returned to the prison camp.

As the Russian Red Army approached Sagan in January 1945, Bethell was amongst the column of prisoners of war marched towards Lübeck, arriving shortly before the end of the war.

== Later career ==
On release from wartime service he joined the trading company Gellatly Hankey in Africa working in the Khartoum and Addis Ababa area until boredom led him to rejoin the general duties branch of the Royal Air Force as a flight lieutenant on 7 December 1949. He became a navigator instructor and also served as personal assistant to Air Chief Marshal Sir George Pirie. In 1953 he was posted to No. 145 Squadron at Celle in Germany flying the de Havilland Vampire, before becoming a flight commander on No. 16 Squadron, also operating Vampires from Celle close to the East German border. Bethell finally retired from the RAF in June 1955, after which he emigrated to Canada.

He was initially employed in the brokerage business in Montreal, he worked for Elican, a Belgian company and later joined the financial services industry. On retiring in the early 1990s he and his wife Lorna moved to a farm at Caledon, Ontario, north of Toronto, where he spent much time on a John Deere tractor cutting fallow hayfields.

== Death ==
Tony Bethell died in Canada on 17 February 2004.

== Bibliography ==
- Foreman, John (2005). RAF Fighter Command Victory Claims, Part Two. Walton-on-Thames: Red Kite. ISBN 0-9546201-5-1.
- Wilson, Philip (2000). The War Behind the Wire. London: Pen and Sword. ASIN BOOKC3LKGI.
- Ted Barris (2014). The Great Escape. Dundurn Publishing. ISBN 978-1459728448.
- Tim Carroll (2005). The Great Escape from Stalag Luft III. Pocket Publishing. ISBN 1416505318.
- Simon Read (2012). Human Game. Constable. ISBN 978-1-4721-1262-0.
- Sean Feast (2015). The Last of the 39-ers. Grub Street. ISBN 978-1909166158.
- Jonathan F Vance (2000). A Gallant Company. Pacifica Military. ISBN 978-0-935-55347-5.
- William Ash; Brendan Foley (2005). Under the Wire: The Wartime Memoir of a Spitfire Pilot, Legendary Escape Artist and 'cooler King'. Bantam. ISBN 978-0-593-05408-6.
- Paul Brickhill (2004). The Great Escape. W.W. Norton & Company. ISBN 978-0-393-32579-9.
- Alan Burgess (1990). The Longest Tunnel: The True Story of World War II's Great Escape. Naval Institute Press. ISBN 978-1-59114-097-9.
- Albert P. Clark (2005). 33 Months as a POW in Stalag Luft III: A World War II Airman Tells His Story. Fulcrum Pub. ISBN 978-1-55591-536-0.
- Arthur A. Durand (1 January 1989). Stalag Luft III: The Secret Story. Patrick Stephens Limited. ISBN 978-1-85260-248-2.
- William R Chorley (1993). RAF Bomber Command Losses, Volume 2. Midland Counties. ISBN 0-950746703.
- Allen Andrews (1976). Exemplary Justice. Harrap. ISBN 0-245-52775-3.
- W R Chorley (1981). To See The Dawn Breaking. William Chorley. ISBN 0-245-52775-3.
- Vance, Jonathan F (2000). A Gallant Company: The Men of the Great Escape. Pacifica Military History. p. 41. ISBN 978-0-935-55347-5.
