= Vickers Virginia =

Biplane heavy bomber of the British Royal Air Force

Virginia
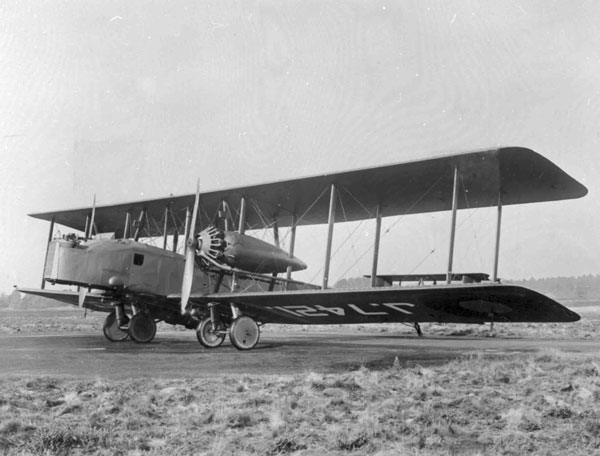
- Virginia X in 1922

General information
- Type: Heavy night-bomber
- Manufacturer: Vickers Limited
- Primary user: Royal Air Force
- Number built: 124

History
- Introduction date: 1924
- First flight: 24 November 1922
- Retired: 1941
- Developed from: Vickers Vimy

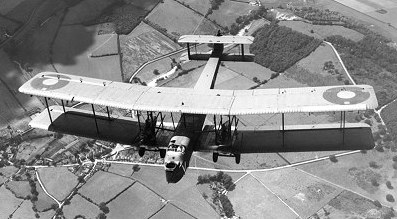
Vickers Virginia in flight

The Vickers Virginia was a biplane heavy bomber of the British Royal Air Force, developed from the Vickers Vimy, and was the mainstay of the interwar RAF heavy night bombing force.

== Design and development ==
The Vickers Virginia was designed to meet the requirements of Air Ministry specifications 1/21 for a long-range heavy bomber intended to replace the Vickers Vimy.

Two prototypes were ordered on 13 January 1921, with an additional two prototypes ordered in September 1922. The Virginia resembled the Vimy but notably had a lowered front gunner's position, providing the pilot with a greater field of view, 20 ft (6 m) greater wingspan and a 9 ft (3 m) longer fuselage. It was powered by two Napier Lion engines and flew for the first time on 24 November 1922.

The Virginia prototype underwent type trials at the Aircraft Experimental Establishment at RAF Martlesham Heath at the end of 1922. One of the first modifications was the replacement of the original two-bladed propellers by four-bladed propellers. An unusual set of "fighting top" turrets was added to the upper wings, but these were later deleted from production aircraft.

Vickers Virginia Marks I–VI had straight wings and retained the wooden framed wings and fuselages covered in canvas derived from the earlier Vickers Vimy. Starting with the Mark III, the Virginia had a rear fuselage gunner. Early Virginias had an internal bomb bay for eight 112 lb bombs (51 kg), or could be fitted with under-wing racks for two heavier 550 lb bombs (249 kg).

In 1926, the Vickers Virginia Mk VII became the principal production version of the type. This version introduced 6-degree swept-back metal-framed outer wings while retaining the wooden fuselage, and the rear gunner was moved into a tail turret. They were powered by two 500 hp Napier Lion V engines. Eleven were newly built aircraft, and thirty-eight were converted from earlier marks.

The final major development of the Vickers Virginia series was the Mark X, introduced in 1929. This version adopted an all-metal airframe constructed from duralumin and steel, with covering panels of fabric, aluminium, and wood. They could carry a 3,000 lb bomb load (1,360 kg), and had top speed of 108 mph (174 km/h) at 5,000 ft (1,500 m), with a range of 985 miles (1,585 km). Defensive armament consisted of one Lewis gun in the nose and a twin Lewis gun in the tail. 50 newly constructed Mark X aircraft and 53 surviving earlier models were converted or remanufactured to the Mark X standard.

A total of 126 Virginias were built across all variants, including 2 prototypes (Mark I & Mark II), 6 Mark III, 2 Mark IV, 22 Mark V, 25 Mark VI, 11 Mark VII, 8 Mark IX, and 50 Mark X. These figures are for newly built airframes, with earlier marks also being upgraded.

== Operational history ==
No. 7 Squadron RAF was the first squadron to receive the Vickers Virginia Mark III in early 1924. Despite mediocre performance, the aircraft served frontline units until 1938, replaced by the newer Wellingtons, Hampdens and Whitleys. Designs such as the Fairey Hendon and Handley Page Heyford both supplemented and replaced the Virginia.

The final Virginia Mark X was the most numerous RAF bomber until the Heyford in 1934. After its technical obsolescence as a bomber, it was used for photography and for parachute training, with jump platforms installed behind the engine nacelles.

The Vickers Virginia played an important role in early British autopilot research. At the Royal Aircraft Establishment (RAE), several Virginia Mk VII aircraft were used for experimental trials to develop automatic flight-control systems. During one of these tests, Flight Lieutenant Langford-Sainsbury of No. 15 Squadron RAF experienced an uncontrolled dive when an early autopilot mechanism malfunctioned and could not be disconnected before the aircraft reached dangerously high speed. By the time the final production Virginia Mk X entered RAF service in January 1928, a reliable and effective three-channel autopilot had been developed and was fitted to operational aircraft. No. 7 Squadron RAF was the first unit to receive Virginias equipped with these automatic pilots.

In the 1930s, the Virginias were used in some of the first tests of inflight refueling, although they were never used outside of tests.

In 1931 the Vickers Virginia Mark X was used in trials of land catapults for launching heavily laden bombers.

On 26 June 1940, a committee discussing the need for airborne cannon for use against invading tanks suggested equipping Virginias with the equally antiquated COW 37 mm gun. This was not acted on.

The Virginia was developed in parallel with the Vickers Victoria transport aircraft and the two aircraft had much in common, sharing the same wing design.

Despite their obsolescence, Virginias continued to soldier on in support roles with the Parachute Test Flight at Henlow until December 1941.

== Variants ==
Type 57 Virginia Mk I
Initial prototype for the RAF, powered by two 450 hp (340 kW) Napier Lion piston engines. One prototype only.
Type 96 Virginia Mk I
The first type 57 Virginia prototype was re-engined with two 650 hp (490 kW) Rolls-Royce Condor piston engines. One prototype only.
Type 115 Virginia Mk VIII
The Type 96 Virginia prototype was fitted with a lengthened fuselage, new forward fuselage and gun positions. One prototype only.
Type 129 Virginia Mk VII
The Type 115 Virginia was converted into the Virginia VII prototype. One prototype only.
Type 76 Virginia Mk II
Second Virginia prototype, powered by two Napier Lion piston engines, fitted with lengthened nose. One built.
Type 79 Virginia Mk III
Twin-engined heavy night bomber biplane for the RAF, powered by two 468 hp (349 kW) Napier Lion II piston engines, equipped with dual controls. Six built.
Type 99 Virginia Mk IV
Twin-engined heavy night-bomber biplane. Similar to the Virginia Mk II, but with additional equipment.
Type 100 Virginia Mk V
Twin-engined heavy night-bomber biplane, equipped with a third (central) rudder in the tail unit. 22 built.
Type 108 Virginia Mk VI
Twin-engined heavy night-bomber biplane. Introduced revisions in wing folding and rigging. 25 built.
Type 112 Virginia Mk VII
Twin-engined heavy night-bomber biplane. Redesigned nose, lengthened rear fuselage and sweepback wings. 11 built and 38 conversions.
Type 128 Virginia Mk IX
Twin-engined heavy night-bomber biplane. Introduced automatic slats, wheel brakes and a tail gunner's position. Eight built and 27 conversions.
Type 139 Virginia Mk X
Twin-engined heavy night-bomber biplane. Incorporated an all-metal structure. 50 built and 53 conversions.

== Operators ==
United Kingdom

Royal Air Force

- No. 7 Squadron RAF – May 1924 to March 1936 (RAF Bircham Newton, RAF Worthy Down)

Vickers Virginia Mk.III, Mk.VII, Mk.IX and Mk.X

- No. 9 Squadron RAF – April 1924 to May 1936 (RAF Boscombe Down, RAF Andover, RAF Aldergrove)

Vickers Virginia Mk IV (Sep 1924 – Mar 1927)
Vickers Virginia Mk V (Jan 1925 – May 1926)
Vickers Virginia Mk VI (Jun 1925 – Apr 1927)
Vickers Virginia Mk VII (Jul 1926 – Jun 1930)
Vickers Virginia Mk VIII (Jan 1927 – Mar 1927)
Vickers Virginia Mk IX (Jul 1927 – Feb 1932)
Vickers Virginia Mk X (Jan 1929 – Apr 1936)

- No. 58 Squadron RAF – December 1924 to January 1938 (RAF Worthy Down, RAF Upper Heyford, RAF Driffield, RAF Boscombe Down)

Vickers Virginia Mk IV (by 1926)
Vickers Virginia Mk.IX (by 1930)
Vickers Virginia Mk.X (by 1931)

- No. 10 Squadron RAF – September 1932 to January 1935 (RAF Boscombe Down)

Vickers Virginia Mk.X

- No. 51 Squadron RAF – March 1937 to February 1938 (RAF Driffield, RAF Boscombe Down)

Vickers Virginia Mk.X

- No. 75 Squadron RAF – March to September 1937 (RAF Driffield)

Vickers Virginia Mk.X

- No. 214 Squadron RAF – September 1935 to April 1937 (RAF Boscombe Down, RAF Andover, RAF Scampton)

Vickers Virginia Mk.X

- No. 215 Squadron RAF- October 1935 to September 1937 (RAF Worthy Down, RAF Upper Heyford, RAF Driffield)

Vickers Virginia Mk.X

- No. 500 Squadron RAF (County of Kent) – March 1931 to January 1936 (RAF Manston) Special Reserve night-bomber squadron

Vickers Virginia Mk.X

- No. 502 Squadron RAF (Ulster) – December 1931 to October 1935 (RAF Aldergrove) Special Reserve night-bomber squadron

Vickers Virginia Mk.X

- Night Flying Flight (RAF Biggin Hill) - July 1923 to October 1931
- Parachute Test Flight (RAF Henlow)
- Research Development Flight (RAF Farnborough, RAF Exeter)
- Aeroplane and Armament Experimental Establishment No. 15 Squadron RAF – March 1924 to 1934 (RAF Martlesham Heath)

Various types for testing

== Accidents and incidents ==
- 7 April 1925 – Virginia J7439 (Mk VIII, later rebuilt as Mk X): While operating with No. 9 Squadron RAF, the aircraft encountered thick fog over the Thames Estuary and was ditched in the sea off Birchington, Kent. The captain and one crew member were rescued with injuries, while the second pilot and another crewman were reported missing, believed drowned. The wreckage was recovered and rebuilt at Vickers Brooklands as the prototype Virginia Mk X, first flown in May 1927.
- 23 August 1926 – Virginia J7418 (Mk VI): A No. 58 Squadron RAF aircraft crashed at RAF Worthy Down after entering a spin while being flown solo by the pilot. The aircraft was destroyed and the pilot was killed.
- 21 March 1927 – Virginia J7425 (Mk VII): A No. 9 Squadron RAF aircraft force-landed in the Thames Estuary off Sheerness, Kent, after both engines stopped when two main fuel cocks were turned off. All four crew survived and were rescued six hours later by the trawler Pickmere, which towed the floating wreck to Sheerness. The aircraft was written off.
- 16 April 1927 – Virginia J7714 (Mk VI): A No. 9 Squadron RAF aircraft collided with the wing of a stationary Airco DH.9A during take-off from RAF Eastchurch, Isle of Sheppey. It briefly became airborne to about 100 ft (30 m) before crashing and catching fire. All four crew were killed. J7714 was the last Virginia Mk VI operated by No. IX Squadron.
- 16 June 1927 – Virginia J7437: A Virginia made a forced landing between Shipbourne and Plaxtol, Kent, in the early hours of the morning due to engine trouble. The incident was reported as a precautionary landing following mechanical failure.
- 19 August 1927 – Virginia J7418 (No. 58 Squadron): The aircraft was wrecked in a forced landing at Broadbridge Heath, near Horsham, West Sussex, after the port engine failed. One crewman was killed and three survived. The engine failure was attributed to a broken connecting rod that disrupted the oil supply.
- 14 March 1928 – Virginia J8239 (Mk VII): A No. 9 Squadron RAF aircraft collided in mid-air with Bristol F.2B Fighter J7666 of No. 2 Squadron near RAF Manston. The pilot of the Virginia was uninjured.
- 3 October 1929 – Virginia J7424 (Mk X): At RAF Upper Heyford, an airman was killed while hand-swinging the propeller of a No. 58 Squadron RAF aircraft at night.
- 18 February 1930 – Virginia J7420 (Mk X): A No. 7 Squadron RAF aircraft undershot during a night landing and struck the ground. It sustained major damage and was returned to the manufacturer for repairs and modification. The aircraft had originally been built as a Mk V, later converted to Mk VII, and finally to Mk X standard.
- 24 March 1930 – Virginia J7709 (Mk IX; previously Mk VI): A No. 58 Squadron RAF aircraft crashed during a night landing at RAF Worthy Down, Hampshire. Two of the five crew members were killed.
- 4 October 1930 – Virginia J7561 (Mk X): A No. 9 Squadron RAF aircraft from RAF Manston stalled and dived into the ground shortly after take-off, then caught fire. Both pilots were killed and the rear gunner sustained minor injuries. The aircraft was destroyed.
- 19 January 1931 – Virginia J8241 (Mk X): A No. 7 Squadron RAF aircraft struck the Station Headquarters building with its left wing while landing at RAF Worthy Down, Hampshire. The aircraft was destroyed and three of the four crew members were killed.
- 27 March 1931 – Virginia J7129 (Mk X): The aircraft lost its port engine due to propeller-shaft failure and made a forced landing at Old Park, Farnham, Surrey. The Virginia was badly damaged, but all crew members, including pilot F. T. "Ted" Honey, were uninjured.
- 7 October 1932 – Virginia J8237 (Mk X): A No. 58 Squadron RAF aircraft overturned and caught fire after a forced landing near Compton, Surrey. Two of the six crew were killed and four parachuted to safety from 2,000 ft (610 m). Witnesses reported engine trouble or partial structural failure of the upper wing section.
- 8 February 1933 – Virginia J7129 (Mk X): A No. 9 Squadron RAF aircraft struck high ground in fog near Wexcombe, Marlborough, Wiltshire, after clipping a tree. Four of the five crew members were killed and the aircraft was destroyed.
- 16 September 1933 – Virginia K2670 (Mk X): A No. 500 (Special Reserve) Squadron aircraft overshot the runway at Brooklands Aerodrome and ran into a ditch. One of the five crew members was killed.
- 23 July 1935 – Virginia K2675 (Mk X): A Virginia made an emergency landing near Chobham for undetermined reasons. All five crew evacuated safely, but the aircraft was damaged beyond repair.
- 24 July 1935 – Virginia K2672 (Mk X): Shortly after landing at RAF Worthy Down, the aircraft caught fire. The pilot stopped the aircraft and all four occupants escaped unharmed, but the Virginia was destroyed by fire.
- 21 October 1935 – Virginia K2673 (Mk X): A No. 9 Squadron RAF aircraft crashed shortly after take-off near RAF Andover, Hampshire, and caught fire. The pilot, who was the sole occupant, was killed.
- 21 December 1936 – Virginia K2680 (Mk X): A No. 214 Squadron RAF aircraft on approach to Brough Airfield suffered an accident in which the rear gunner fell from the aircraft.
- 4 September 1941 – Virginia J7434 (Mk X): Operating with the Home Aircraft Depot / Parachute Training School at RAF Henlow, Bedfordshire, the aircraft undershot on landing and struck telephone cables. It was written off, marking the loss of the last known airworthy Virginia.

== Video ==
- Film of Vickers Virginia flight operations
- Film of an experimental catapult launch of a Vickers Virginia
- Vickers Virginia Achieves 1st Successful Inflight Re-Fueling

== Specifications (Virginia X) ==
Data from The British Bomber since 1914

General characteristics

- Crew: Four
- Length: 52 ft 3 in (15.93 m)
- Wingspan: 87 ft 8 in (26.72 m)
- Height: 18 ft 2 in (5.54 m)
- Wing area: 2,178 sq ft (202.3 m^{2})
- Empty weight: 9,650 lb (4,377 kg)
- Gross weight: 17,600 lb (7,983 kg)
- Powerplant: 2 × Napier Lion VB 12-cylinder water-cooled broad arrow engines, 580 hp (430 kW) each

Performance

- Maximum speed: 108 mph (174 km/h, 94 kn) at 5,000 ft (1,500 m)
- Range: 985 mi (1,585 km, 856 nmi)
- Service ceiling: 13,800 ft (4,200 m)
- Time to altitude: 10 min to 5,000 ft (1,500 m)

Armament

- Guns: 3 × .303 in (7.7 mm) Vickers machine guns
- Bombs: 3,000 lb (1,360 kg) of bombs

== See also ==
Related development

- Vickers Victoria

Related lists

- List of aircraft of the Royal Air Force
