= Harold Milford =

British aviator (1914–1944)

Harold John Milford
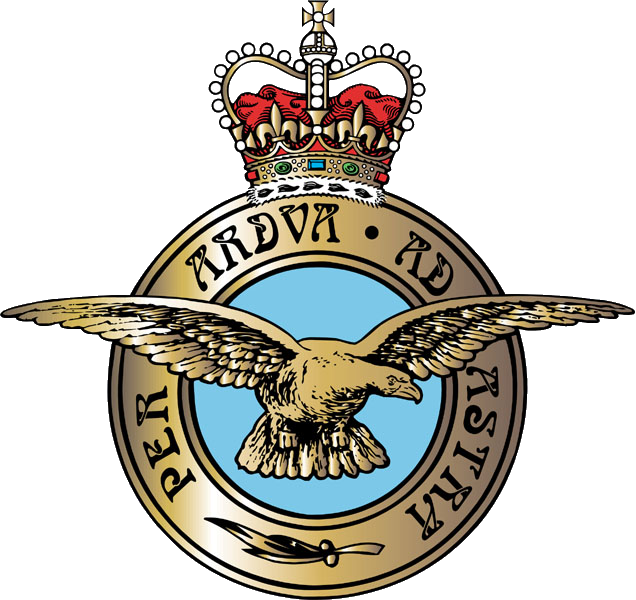
- Born: Harold John Milford; 16 August 1914; Streatham, London, England
- Died: 6 April 1944 (aged 29); Breslau area, Germany
- Burial place: Poznan Old Garrison Cemetery, Poland
- Relatives: Marion Milford (nee Heather) wife
- Military career
- Allegiance: United Kingdom
- Branch: Royal Air Force
- Service years: 1940–1944
- Rank: Flight lieutenant
- Service number: 1375447 and 103586
- Unit: No. 226 Squadron RAF
- Conflicts: World War II: Channel Front (POW)
- Awards: Mention in despatches

Harold John Milford (16 August 1914 – 6 April 1944), was a British Douglas Boston medium bomber observer who was taken prisoner during the Second World War. He took part in the 'Great Escape' from Stalag Luft III in March 1944, but was one of the men re-captured and subsequently shot by the Gestapo.

== Early life ==
Harold Milford was born in Streatham in south-west London, the son of William John Milford a railway worker and his wife Ada Frances and grew up in Medora Road in the Tulse Hill area with his parents and two sisters. In the spring of 1940 he married Marion Heather in Lambeth, London.

== War service ==
At the height of the Battle of Britain he enlisted in the Royal Air Force in the summer of 1940 as an aircraftman aircrew candidate with the service number 1375447. On completion of flight training, as a leading aircraftman he was commissioned as pilot officer on 9 August 1941.

From final stage training at Operational Training Unit Milford joined No. 226 Squadron RAF flying the Douglas Boston medium bomber on daylight precision bombing operations from RAF Swanton Morley against industrial targets and power stations. The medium bombers were invariably met by Luftwaffe day fighters often from the ace Jagdgeschwader 26. He was promoted to flying officer on 9 August 1942 1942.

== Prisoner of war ==
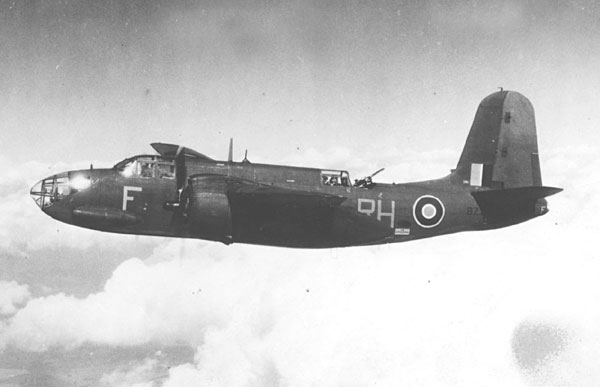
Douglas Boston in RAF service in 1942.

At 10:50 on the morning of 22 September 1942 he took off in Douglas Boston (serial number "AL743") squadron codes MQ-F flown by Sergeant Maurice Collins, the third member of the crew was wireless operator/air gunner Sergeant GA Nicolls. They were part of a force tasked to bomb the power station at Chocques in Pas-de-Calais, France. The bombers were met by the Luftwaffes JG 26 and Klaus Mietusch shot one of the bombers down, the other (serial number "AL685") was also lost nearby. One is believed to have been the victim of Mietusch and the other possibly due to battle damage.

Milford's crew bailed out, the pilot headed off alone and evaded capture to make it home while Milford and Nicholls were captured in a haystack. He was sent to Stalag Luft III in the province of Lower Silesia near the town of Sagan (now Żagań in Poland) where he quickly met Johnny Williams who he hadknown earlier in his service and made friends with Tony Hayter who lived in the same accommodation block.

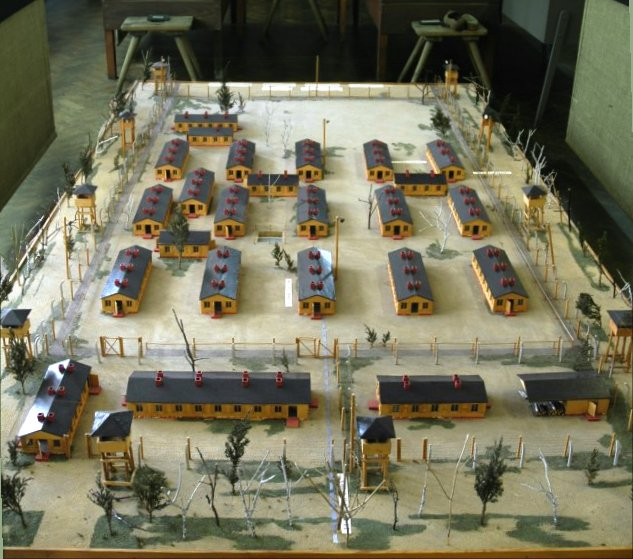
Model of Stalag Luft III prison camp.

== 'Great Escape' ==
Milford was one of the 76 men who escaped the prison camp on the night of 24–25 March 1944, in the escape now famous as "the Great Escape". Milford escaped from the exposed tunnel mouth into the woods with Sandy Gunn and John F Williams, although on the afternoon of 27 March 1944 after surviving the freezing temperatures and blizzards they were recaptured in the vicinity of Żagań and taken to the local civil prison. On 28 March they were moved to Görlitz prison. Milford's cell occupants were Cyril Swain, Mike Casey, Tom Leigh, Jack Grisman, Ian Cross, Sandy Gunn, Patrick Langford and George Wiley. Over the next few days the cells filled up as more and more escapers were recaptured and then groups of prisoners began to be removed and the numbers thinned out rapidly. While being interrogated Milford was told that his wife would never see him again. Early on the morning of 6 April 1944 Tony Bethell heard a truck arrive at the prison and then six names being called out, Denys Street, Neville McGarr, Jack Grisman, Sandy Gunn, Harold Milford and John F Williams were taken away. They were murdered by the Breslau Gestapo.

His body was cremated in Breslau's crematorium. He was one of the 50 escapers executed and murdered by the Gestapo. His cremated ashes, originally buried at Sagan, are now buried in part of the Poznan Old Garrison Cemetery.

Milford's name was amongst those in the list of the murdered prisoners which was published when news broke on or about 20 May 1944.

Memorial to "The Fifty" down the road toward Żagań (Brettell is near top left)

== Awards ==
Mentioned in despatches recognizing his conspicuous bravery as a prisoner because none of the other relevant decorations then available could be awarded posthumously. It was published in a supplement to the London Gazette on 8 June 1944.

== Other victims ==
See Stalag Luft III murders

The Gestapo executed a group of 50 of the recaptured prisoners representing almost all of the nationalities involved in the escape. Post-war investigations saw a number of those guilty of the murders tracked down, arrested and tried for their crimes.

Nationalities of the 50 executed
(United Kingdom) 21 British
(Canada) 6 Canadian
(Poland) 6 Polish
(Australia) 5 Australian
(South Africa) 3 South African
(New Zealand) 2 New Zealanders
(Norway) 2 Norwegian
(Belgium) 1 Belgian
(Czechoslovakia) 1 Czechoslovak
(France) 1 Frenchman
(Greece) 1 Greek
(Lithuania) 1 Lithuanian
