= Sandy Gunn =

WW2 Scottish pilot and prisoner of war

Alastair Donald Mackintosh Gunn
- Born: Alastair Donald Mackintosh Gunn; 27 September 1919; Auchterarder, Perthshire, Scotland
- Died: 6 April 1944 (aged 24) between Görlitz and Breslau
- Burial place: Poznań Old Garrison Cemetery, Poland
- Military career
- Allegiance: United Kingdom
- Branch: Royal Air Force
- Service years: 1940–1944
- Rank: Flight Lieutenant
- Nickname: Sandy
- Service number: 60340
- Unit: No. 1 Photographic Reconnaissance Unit RAF
- Conflicts: World War II: Channel Front (POW)
- Awards: Mentioned in Despatches Twice

Alastair Donald Mackintosh "Sandy" Gunn (27 September 1919 – 6 April 1944) was a Scottish Supermarine Spitfire photo reconnaissance pilot who was taken prisoner during the Second World War. Gunn took part in the "Great Escape" from Stalag Luft III in March 1944, and was one of the men re-captured and murdered by the Gestapo.

== Pre-war life ==
Gunn was born at home in Auchterarder, Perthshire, the son of surgeon James Turner Gunn, MB, ChB, FRCS and Adelaide Lucy Frances [nee Macdonald] Gunn. He was reportedly a fine athlete at school, being a member of 1st XV rugby & 1st XI cricket team. He attended Cargilfield Preparatory School and Fettes College, both in Edinburgh, and was a school prefect. After leaving school, Gunn became an engineering apprentice at the Govan, Glasgow shipyard of Harland and Wolff. After a year he gained entry to Pembroke College, Cambridge to study mechanical sciences hoping for a career as a diesel engineer.

== Early war service ==
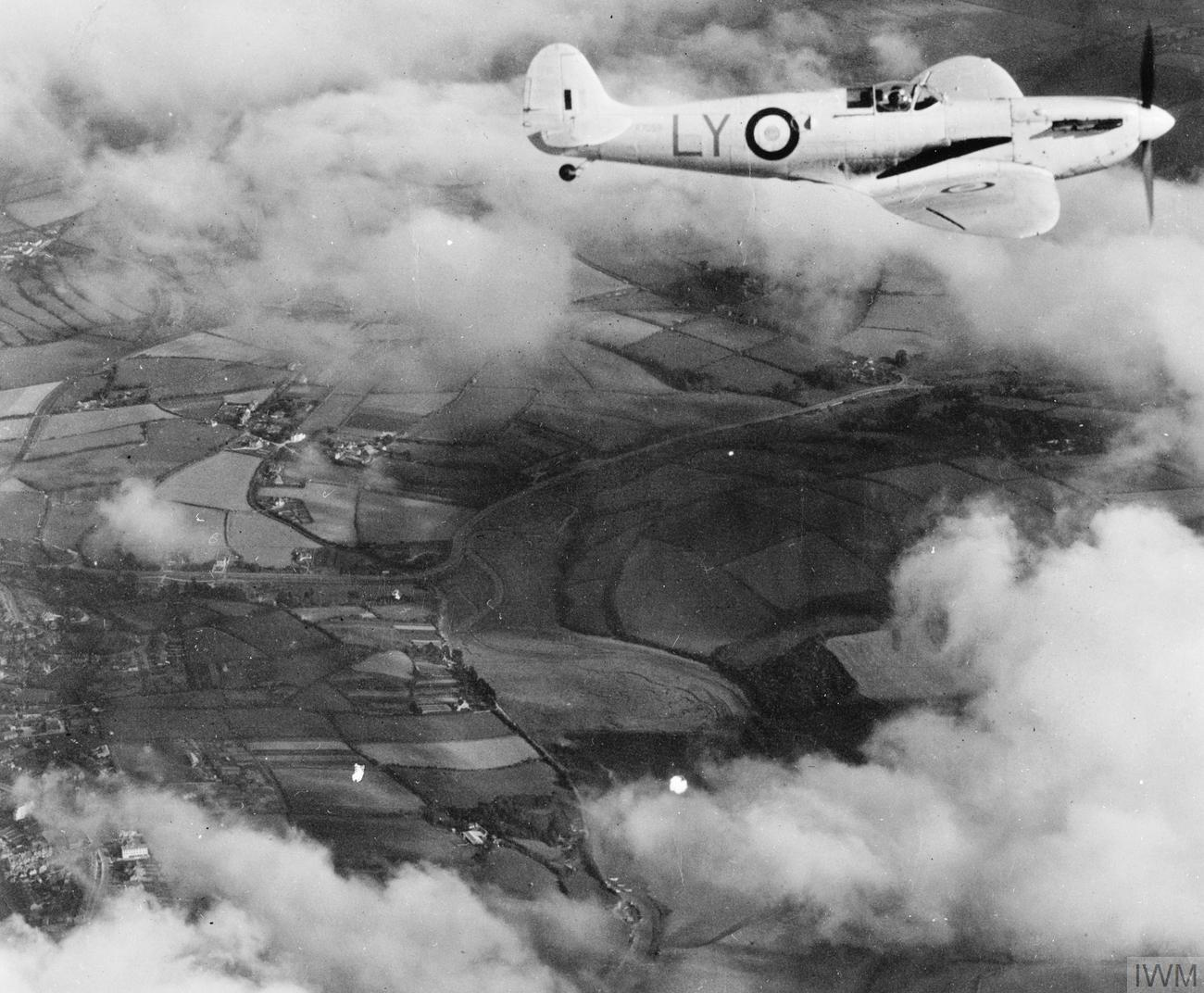
A 1 PRU Spitfire in flight

Gunn enlisted in the Royal Air Force on 22 February 1940 and commenced active service on 22 June 1940 as an aircrew candidate (aircraftsman 2nd class). He began his flying training at RAF Ansty near Coventry, and later at Blackpool.

On 18 January 1941 he received his pilot's brevet and promotion to sergeant. He was commissioned as a Pilot Officer on 25 January 1941. Gunn joined No. 48 Squadron RAF of RAF Coastal Command flying Avro Anson aircraft on photo reconnaissance missions. A reliable record flying with the squadron led to Gunn being posted to RAF Benson to fly stripped-down high-altitude conversion Supermarine Spitfires with 1 Photographic Reconnaissance Unit in September 1941. In January 1942 he was posted to RAF Wick in the north of Scotland. Wick was a noted photo reconnaissance aerodrome; in May 1941, a Spitfire from Wick found and photographed Bismarck in a Norwegian fjord. Bismarck was later sunk by the Royal Navy, but Tirpitz remained a threat in Norway.

Gunn was promoted to Flying Officer on 25 January 1942, and flew many long-range missions over German naval units on the Norwegian coast and in the North Atlantic, often in terrible weather. On one occasion he crashed in the North Atlantic after his aircraft ran out of fuel.

== Prisoner of war ==
At 08:07 hours on the morning of 5 March 1942, Gunn took off from Wick in Supermarine Spitfire PR Mk IV AA810 on a photo reconnaissance mission of the German naval anchorages on the Norwegian coastline near Trondheim, Norway. He was shot down with burns on his hands and face by two Messerschmitt Bf 109s from Jagdgruppe Losigkeit, flown by Leutnants Heinz Knoke and Dieter Gerhard. Gunn bailed out before his Spitfire crashed near Langurda in Surnadal Municipality, Norway, and was made a prisoner of war.

Gunn was initially suspected by the Germans of having flown from a covert RAF base somewhere in northern Norway. He was questioned over a period of three weeks before being processed into the prison camp system. Gunn was sent to Stalag Luft III in the German province of Lower Silesia near the town of Sagan (now Żagań, Poland), where he became a regular member of the tunnelling team. In captivity, Gunn was promoted to Flight Lieutenant (24 January 1943).

== The 'Great Escape' ==
Memorial to "The Fifty" on the road near Żagań. (Gunn is listed on the left tablet).

Gunn was one of 76 men who escaped the prison camp on the night of 24/25 March 1944 in the "Great Escape". The alarms sounded upon the discovery of the escape attempt when he had been outside the wire for less than an hour. Gunn was quickly arrested on the road to Görlitz (to the south of the camp), and arrived at the collection point for recaptured officers at Görlitz prison.

The prisoners were interrogated harshly. Mike Casey and Gunn were both told that they would lose their heads. At Görlitz prison on the morning of 6 April 1944, Tony Bethell heard a truck arrive and saw three Germans in uniform call out the names of Denys Street, Neville McGarr, Jack Grisman, Harold Milford, John F. Williams and Sandy Gunn. No firm evidence was found of the fate of the six men; their records were marked "killed at a place unknown, on or after 6 April 1944"

== Outcome ==
Gunn was one of 50 escapees murdered by the Gestapo. He was cremated at Breslau. Originally his remains were buried at Sagan, although his ashes are now interred in the Old Garrison Cemetery, Poznań. Gunn's name was amongst those in the list of the murdered prisoners, which was published in the press in British and Commonwealth countries when news broke on or about 20 May 1944. Post-war investigations saw a number of those guilty of the murders tracked down, arrested, and tried for their crimes; some were executed. In 2018, wreckage of Gunn's aircraft was found in a peat bog in Surnadal Municipality, Norway, and brought back to Britain.

== Awards ==
- Mentioned in Despatches on 5 June 1942 for service as pilot officer
- Mentioned in Despatches for conspicuous gallantry as a prisoner of war
