= Tom Leigh (RAF officer) =

Thomas Barker Leigh
- Born: 11 February 1919; Waverley, Sydney, Australia
- Died: 31 March 1944 (aged 25) between Halbau and Görlitz, Germany
- Burial place: Poznan Old Garrison Cemetery, Poland
- Military career
- Allegiance: United Kingdom
- Branch: Royal Air Force
- Service years: 1932–44
- Rank: Flight Lieutenant
- Service number: 568142 and 46462
- Unit: No. 76 Squadron RAF
- Conflicts: Second World War; Channel Front (POW)
- Awards: Mentioned in Despatches

Thomas Barker Leigh (11 February 1919 – 31 March 1944) was an Australian-born Handley Page Halifax bomber rear gunner who was taken prisoner during the Second World War. He took part in the 'Great Escape' from Stalag Luft III in March 1944, but was one of the men re-captured and subsequently shot by the Gestapo.

== Pre-war life ==
Leigh was born in Waverley, Sydney, Australia, on 11 February 1919. He was the second son of a British father and an Australian mother who resided in Shanghai, China. His mother had sailed back to Australia for his birth before returning to China. She died in 1926 and their father died in 1932, but the three children had lived in England since their mother's death where they attended boarding schools and spent holidays with family friends or their guardian.

On leaving school Leigh passed the entrance examination for the Training Ship Mercury near Southampton and on 30 September 1934 began to train for a life at sea. From the training ship he could see Hamble airfield and soon decided that aviation was his interest. He left the Mercury on 29 July 1935 having been accepted for the 32nd Entry of RAF Apprentices commencing 20 August 1935 at the Royal Air Force's No. 1 School of Technical Training RAF, based at RAF Halton in Buckinghamshire. Leigh was assigned service number 568142 and attached to A Squadron, No. 1 Wing as an aero engine Fitter II. He was promoted to leading apprentice which usually involved commanding a room of 21 junior boys. He "passed out" (graduated) on 26 July 1938 and was attached to No. 48 Squadron RAF as an Aircraftman 2nd Class.

== Wartime service ==
He had the opportunity of aircrew training and became a sergeant air gunner joining the newly reforming No. 76 Squadron RAF in May 1941 based at RAF Linton-on-Ouse, Yorkshire. After relocating to RAF Middleton St George the squadron carried out its first bombing operation on the night of 12–13 June 1941 and then carried out raids on a variety of targets including industrial centres and railways.

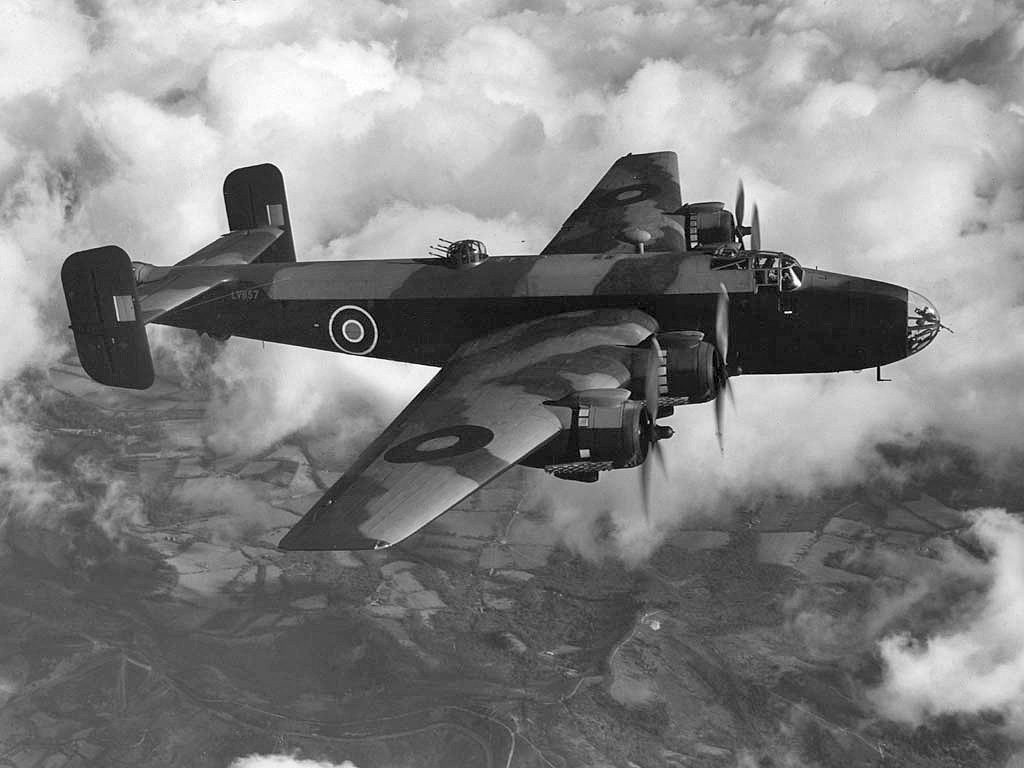
Halifax bomber in flight.

Leigh had been recommended for a commission and was commissioned pilot officer and allocated service number 46462 on 30 September 1941 (with effect from 2 August 1941).

=== Prisoner of war ===
On the night of 5 August 1941 Leigh flew as rear gunner aboard Handley Page Halifax (serial number "L9516"), attacking railway workshops at Karlsruhe in Germany. The bomber took off from RAF Middleton St George at about 21:45 hours and bombed the larger of two fires below before being "coned" (illuminated by a battery of searchlights). Half of the bomber's tail section was shot off and at about 02:00 hours Sergeant Thomas Byrne, the pilot, gave the order to bale out over Germany. Six of the seven-man crew were captured, the other having been killed. Leigh was captured at about 07:00 hours that morning near Worms and after processing and interrogation at Dulag Luft at Oberusel, was allocated Prisoner of War No. 63 at Stalag Luft I, in Barth.

At Stalag Luft I he met Roger Bushell during various escape attempts, Bushell later masterminded the Great Escape. Leigh, Edgar Humphreys, Jack Grisman, Leslie George Bull and several other prisoners were part of the group with Bushell who were sent to Stalag Luft III in the province of Lower Silesia near the town of Sagan (now Żagań in Poland). On 2 August 1942, Leigh was promoted to flying officer, and exactly one year later he was promoted again to flight lieutenant.

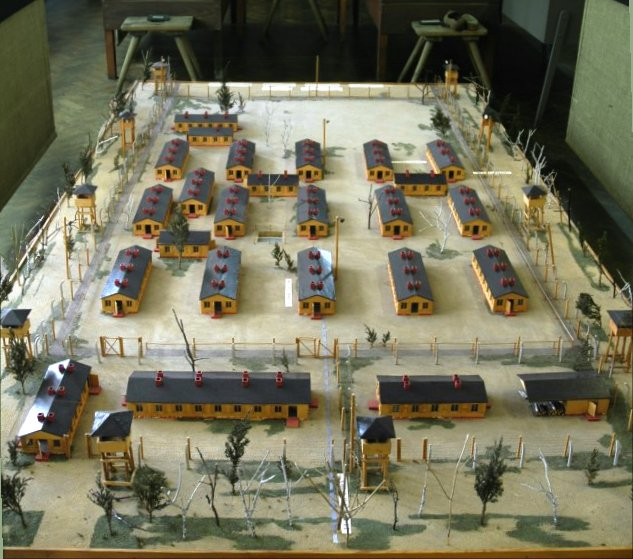
Model of Stalag Luft III prison camp.

=== 'Great Escape' ===
He was one of the 76 men who escaped the prison camp on the night of 24–25 March 1944, in the escape now famous as "the Great Escape". When the Germans discovered the escape they began extensive well planned manhunts. Recaptured after travelling for several nights on foot in freezing conditions Leigh was one of nineteen officers loaded into a lorry the following day and moved to Görlitz prison under Gestapo control. Here the numbers of recaptured officers grew until thirty-five were held there. The prisoners were threatened with death and interrogated harshly but not physically.

On 30 March 1944, two of the survivors saw three large sedans with ten Gestapo agents collect six officers, Ian Cross, Mike Casey, George Wiley, Tom Leigh, John Pohe and Al Hake struggling to walk on his frostbitten feet. they were not seen again having been shot in woods near Görlitz and Halbau, their cremation urn labels stated that they died on 31 March 1944 and had been cremated at Görlitz.

He was one of the 50 escapers executed and murdered by the Gestapo. Originally cremated and buried at Sagan, he is now buried in part of the Poznan Old Garrison Cemetery. Post-war investigation found that a Gestapo agent named Lux led the squad who shot the group of six recaptured airmen beside the autobahn near Halbau on the instructions of a senior officer named Scharpwinkel.

He was among the 47 murdered officers named in the British and Commonwealth press when the story became public knowledge on or about 19–20 May 1944. The Glasgow Herald of 19 May 1944 published an early list naming several officers who had been killed. Leigh was not listed with other Australians named in an article in The Canberra Times on 28 February 1946.

Memorial to "The Fifty" down the road toward Żagań. Leigh is shown on the right hand panel

As a "Halton brat" or an "old Haltonian", a graduate of the RAF Halton aircraft apprentice scheme, Leigh is commemorated by name in the stained glass window in St. George's Church, RAF Halton dedicated to those murdered following the "Great Escape". He is also commemorated on the Dunsfold War Memorial website.

== Recognition ==
Leigh was mentioned in despatches for conspicuous gallantry as a prisoner of war (none of the other relevant decorations then available could be awarded posthumously). The citation was published in a supplement to the London Gazette on 8 June 1944.

== Other victims ==
See Stalag Luft III murders

The Gestapo executed a group of 50 of the recaptured prisoners representing almost all of the nationalities involved in the escape. Post-war investigations saw a number of those guilty of the murders tracked down, arrested and tried for their crimes.

Nationalities of the 50 executed
21 British
6 Canadian
6 Polish
5 Australian
3 South African
2 New Zealanders
2 Norwegian
1 Belgian
1 Czechoslovak
1 Frenchman
1 Greek
1 Lithuanian
