= Alfie Fripp =

British Royal Air Force leader

Alfred George Fripp
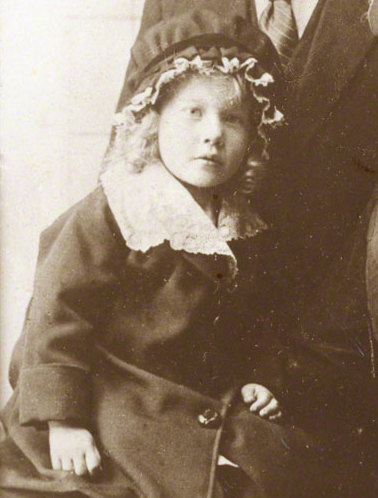
- Born: 13 June 1914; England
- Died: 3 January 2013 (aged 98); Bournemouth, Dorset, England
- Spouse: Vera Violet Allen (m. 1939)
- Relatives: Robert Fripp (nephew)
- Military career
- Allegiance: United Kingdom
- Branch: Royal Air Force
- Service years: 1930–1969
- Rank: Squadron leader
- Nicknames: Alfie, or Bill
- Service number: 565033
- Unit: No. 57 Squadron RAF
- Conflicts: Second World War
- Other work: Laboratory at Brockenhurst College

Alfred George Fripp (13 June 1914 – 3 January 2013), known as "Alfie" or "Bill", was a British Royal Air Force squadron leader who was a flight sergeant during the Second World War. He was shot down by the Luftwaffe in 1939 and held in twelve different prisoner of war camps, including Stalag Luft III, later the site of the "Great Escape". As the last of the "39ers" (those taken prisoner in the first year of the war), he was the oldest surviving and longest serving British POW.

== Early life ==
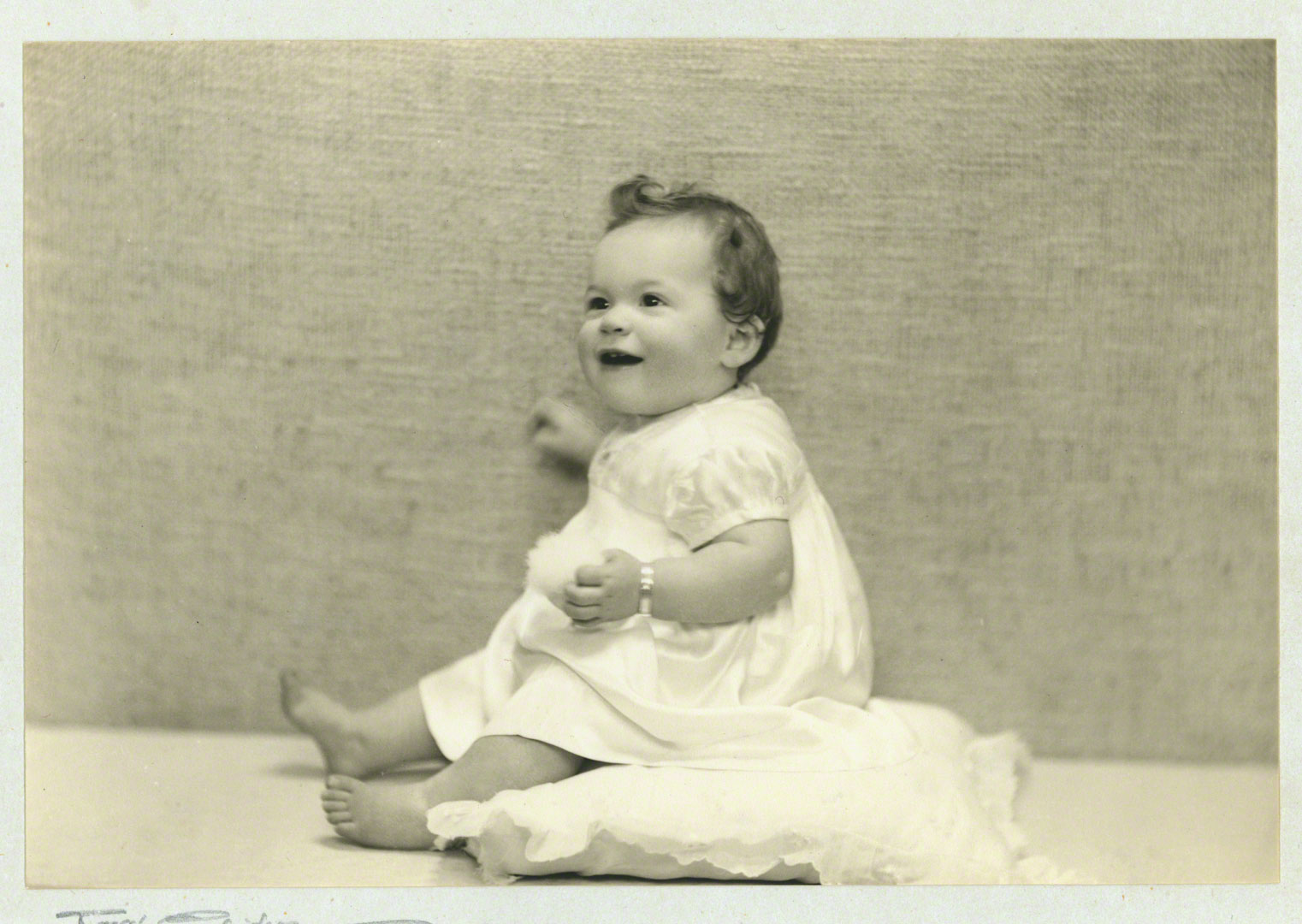
Baby Alfie Fripp

Fripp was born in Alverstoke (Hampshire, England) on 13 June 1914. He was raised in Wimborne (Dorset England).

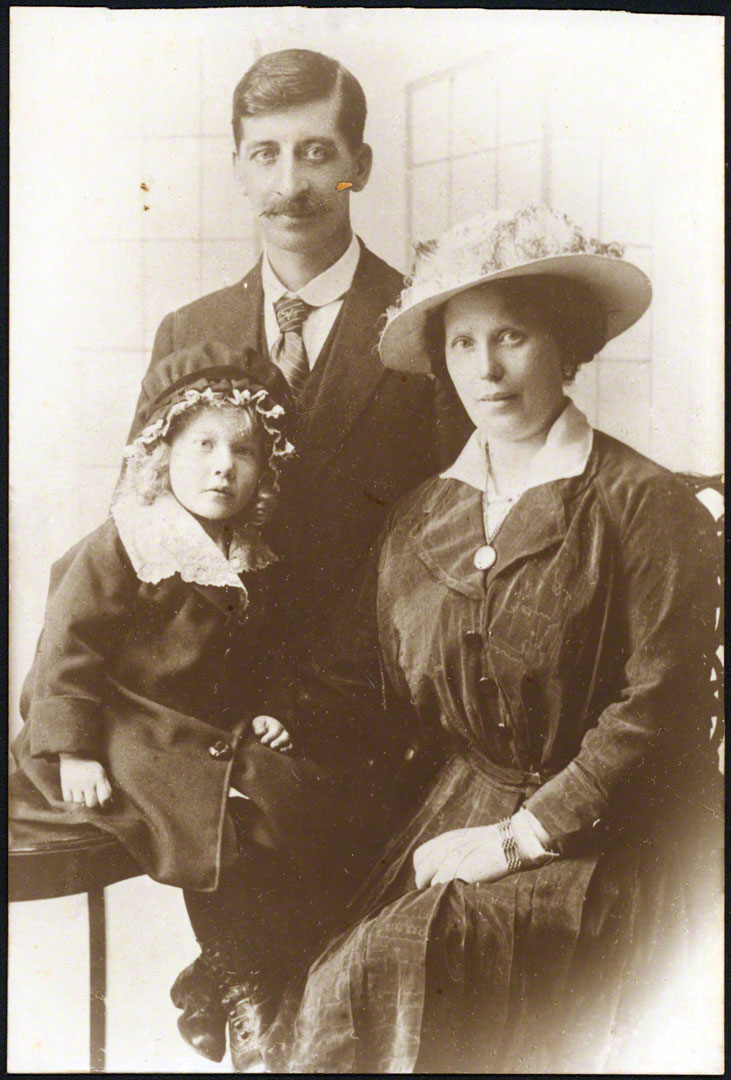
Alfie Fripp and parents

== Royal Air Force career ==
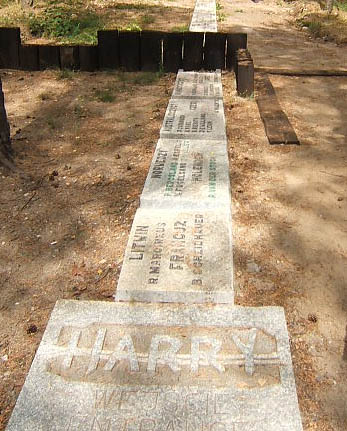
As a POW, Fripp provided maps and tools for tunnelling the great escape from Stalag Luft III.

Fripp's father was a regular in the Royal Marines and, from the age of twelve, Fripp had planned to become an artificer apprentice in the Royal Navy. He failed the medical exam, however, as he was almost four inches shorter than the requirement. When he learned the Royal Air Force was recruiting apprentices of all heights, he took the RAF entrance exam to become an electrical apprentice. Fripp enlisted in the RAF on 30 September 1930 at RAF Halton, and in 1932 transferred to training for wireless operators. He joined No. 57 Squadron RAF in 1939. Three days after the declaration of war on 3 September 1939, just before 57 Squadron was called to duty, Fripp married Vera Violet Allen.

== Prisoner of war ==
On 13 October 1939, while on a reconnaissance mission as an observer, the Bristol Blenheim aircraft he was in was shot at, pursued, and forced into an emergency landing in Germany. Fripp and the pilot, Flight Lieutenant Mike Casey, were captured, along with Aircraftsman 1st class J Nelson, all of whom emerged with bruises and scrapes. From 1939 until 1945, Fripp was a prisoner of war. On 25 October Fripp wrote a letter to his wife from Kriegsgefangenen-Mannschafts-Stammlager VII-A in Moosburg, Germany; Fripp assured his wife of his well-being and suggested that Germany might be a nice place to visit for their honeymoon. He and six other airmen were allowed to record thirty-second Christmas messages to their families, which were broadcast on shortwave radio from Berlin; Fripp sent greetings to his mother and told his wife, "Although I shall not be at home with you in person, I shall be with you in spirit." His wife was staying at his mother's home in Wimborne.

Fripp was imprisoned at Stalag Luft III, the site of an escape attempt by an international group of prisoners of war in March 1944. A fictionalised version of the escape was depicted in the 1963 film, The Great Escape. Before the escape, Fripp collected parcels from the Red Cross, some of which contained maps and equipment such as radio parts. While Fripp was collecting the parcels, he occasionally "liberated" tools, such as steel files and wire cutters, which were used to dig the tunnel. Fripp was moved to another stalag two months before the escape. His pilot, Casey, escaped from Stalag Luft III, but he was recaptured and murdered (along with forty-nine other escaped prisoners) on the orders of Adolf Hitler.

Fripp was held in eleven other prison camps, in which he often served as a representative of the Red Cross. At the end of the war, he and other POWs were forced into "The Long March" from Poland to Germany, as German forces retreated before the Army of the Soviet Union.

It is little short of a miracle that I have survived for so long, through a forced landing in the Bay of Biscay in a Scapa flying boat in 1936 whilst ferrying it to Alexandria, to a pre-war crash in a Blenheim Mk I in 1938, through my World War II experiences to the present day.

— Alfie Fripp

Fripp continued to serve in the RAF until 1969 and attained the rank of Squadron Leader.

In 2009, Fripp returned to Stalag Luft III, where he and others commemorated his fallen comrades. On that occasion, he said "I'm glad I came to remember Mike – you reflect back on all the memories and the people you knew. As for the Germans, I’ve forgiven them but not forgotten."

== Civilian career ==
After retiring from the RAF, Fripp moved to Bournemouth, Dorset and joined Brockenhurst's sixth form college, where he supervised the scientific laboratory. He worked for ten years before retiring at the age of 65.

== Personal life ==
Fripp and his wife Vera had two daughters. He was a grandfather and great-grandfather.

His nephew Robert Fripp is a guitarist and founding member of King Crimson.

== Death ==
Fripp died in hospital in Bournemouth on 3 January 2013 at the age of 98. He was the oldest surviving Second World War British prisoner of war. His wife had earlier died at the age of 84. BBC Radio 2 broadcast a tribute to Fripp, which ended with David Bowie's song "Heroes", which features the guitar playing of Fripp's nephew, Robert Fripp; in this show, the guitarist shared recorded interviews with his "Uncle Bill".

== See also ==
- Paul Brickhill
- Roger Bushell
