= Al Hake =

RAAF fighter pilot (1916–1944)

Albert Horace Hake
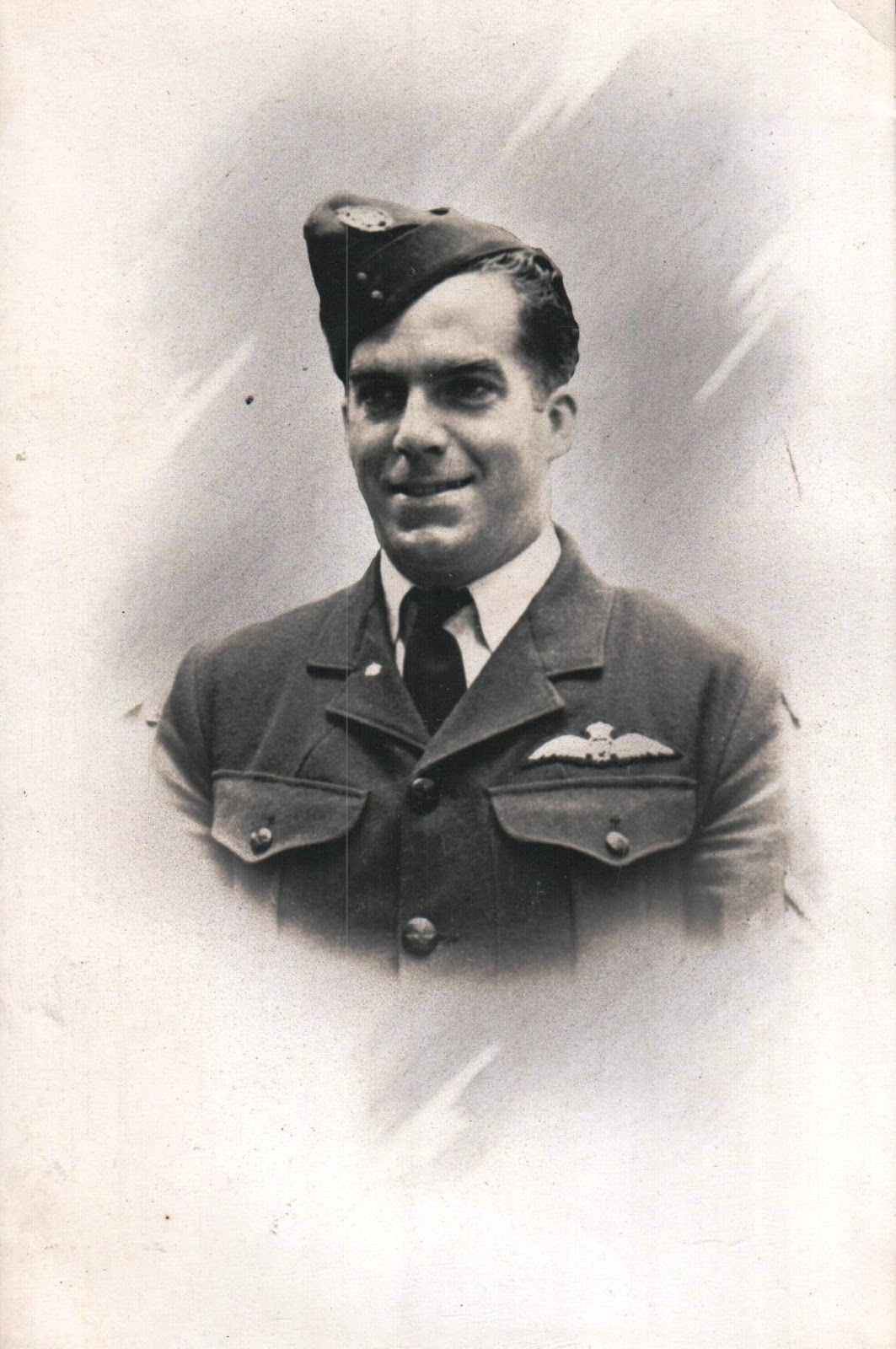
- Al Hake in 1943.
- Born: Hake, Albert Horace; 30 June 1916; Sydney, Australia
- Died: 31 March 1944 (aged 27) between Halbau and Görlitz, Germany
- Burial place: Poznan Old Garrison Cemetery, Poland
- Relatives: Noela Aundree Lillian Hake (wife)
- Military career
- Allegiance: Australia
- Branch: Royal Australian Air Force
- Service years: 1941–1944
- Rank: Warrant Officer
- Nickname: Al
- Service number: 403218
- Unit: No. 72 Squadron RAF
- Conflicts: World War II; Channel Front (POW)
- Awards: Mentioned in Despatches

Albert Horace Hake (30 June 1916 – 31 March 1944) was an Australian Supermarine Spitfire pilot who was taken prisoner during the Second World War. He took part in the 'Great Escape' from Stalag Luft III in March 1944 and was one of the men recaptured and subsequently shot by the Gestapo.

== Pre-war life ==
Hake was born on 30 June 1916 close to Sydney's Parramatta River and spent much of his time with his brother Les on the water on homemade rafts and boats including a night adrift in Sydney Harbour with the authorities searching for them. He was recognized at school for his talent in technical drawing and metal working, this gained entry to Sydney Technical High School for him. He was a serious student and moved directly from school into a good position with an air conditioning company, his ambition at that time was to own his own "air con" company.

== War service ==
Following the outbreak of war in Europe Hake joined the Royal Australian Air Force Reserve in July 1940 and answered immediately to call-up on 4 January 1941. He wished to fly and his instructors recommended that had the aptitude to train for aircrew so after basic training he was posted to Wagga Wagga where all Australian aircrew candidates were screened for aptitude. While here he married his girlfriend Noela Horsfall. He learned to fly and attained the required grade and graduated on 20 August 1941. On 7 September 1941 he joined a group of airmen embarking aboard the ocean liner "Athlone Castle" for England to continue his training with No, 53 Operational Training Unit at RAF Llandow in Wales flying Supermarine Spitfire aircraft. He completed training on 14 January 1942 amongst the top 3 pilots on the source.

In January 1942 he joined No. 72 Squadron RAF flying Supermarine Spitfires from RAF Biggin Hill carrying out operational fighter sweeps and bomber escort missions over the English Channel occupied France and the Netherlands.

== Prisoner of war ==
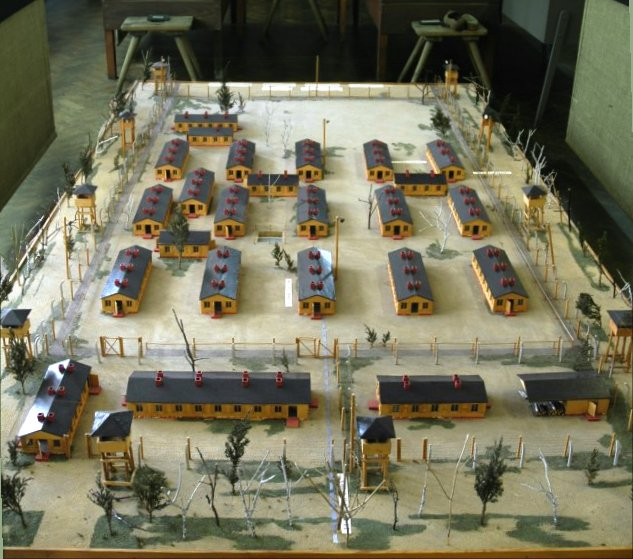
Model of Stalag Luft III prison camp.

In major fighter action code named "Circus 119" on 4 April 1942 ten Supermarine Spitfires were shot down in combat with a large group of Luftwaffe Focke-Wulf Fw 190s, Hake's own aircraft Supermarine Spitfire Mark Vb (serial number "AB258") was shot up badly by enemy fighters before anti-aircraft fire damaged his propeller also setting his aircraft on fire. He bailed out and landed by parachute slightly wounded and burned beside a unit of the German Army. Sergeant Hake noted the respect shown by the Germans to a Spitfire pilot and their assumption that he was an officer so he played along and throughout his imprisonment was believed by the Germans to be an officer.

He became prisoner of war No. 6 held at Stalag Luft III in the province of Lower Silesia near the town of Sagan (now Żagań in Poland). Hake occupied himself with a vegetable patch during the early stages of his captivity but soon his talents at making and fixing things brought him into the escapers' group where he developed a production line system to hand make compass equipment for escapers. He became a forger of Nazi travel documents and recovering from a mild bout of diphtheria in mid-September 1942 he set up the compass factory in his room in the northern end of Block 103 melting pieces of broken Bakelite phonograph record to be fixed to pieces of razor blade which was duly magnetized. Over 200 were produced.

== 'Great Escape' ==
He was one of the 76 men who escaped the prison camp on the night of 24–25 March 1944, in the escape now famous as "the Great Escape". When the Germans discovered the escape they began extensive well planned manhunts. Al Hake was one of the prisoners recaptured relatively quickly - on the afternoon of 27 March 1944 he and his escape partner Johnny Pohe were brought into the cells at Görlitz suffering the effects of a tough journey in the freezing cold weather, both were frostbitten, Hake the worse of the two. Nineteen recaptured officers were loaded into a lorry the following day and moved to Görlitz prison under Gestapo control. Here the numbers of recaptured officers grew until thirty-five were held there. The prisoners were threatened with death and interrogated harshly but not physically. On 30 March 1944 two of the survivors saw three large sedans with ten Gestapo agents collect six officers, Ian Cross, Michael James Casey, George Wiley, Tom Leigh, John Pohe and Al Hake struggling to walk on his frostbitten feet. They were not seen again, their cremation urn labels stated that they died on 31 March 1944 and had been cremated at Görlitz.

He was one of the 50 escapers executed and murdered by the Gestapo. His cremated ahes originally buried at Sagan, he is now buried in part of the Poznan Old Garrison Cemetery.

Post-war investigation found that a Gestapo agent named Lux led the squad who shot the group of six recaptured airmen beside the autobahn near Halbau on the instructions of a senior officer named Scharpwinkel.

He was amongst the 47 murdered officers named in the British and Commonwealth press when the story became public knowledge on or about 19–20 May 1944 The Glasgow Herald of 19 May 1944 published an early list naming several officers including Hake. He and the other Australians were named in an article in the Canberra Times newspaper on 28 February 1946.

Al Hake was promoted to warrant officer either in captivity or more likely posthumously.

Memorial to "The Fifty" down the road toward Żagań. Hake on left hand panel

== Awards ==
Mentioned in despatches for conspicuous gallantry as a prisoner of war (none of the other relevant decorations then available could be awarded posthumously). It was published in a supplement to the London Gazette on 8 June 1944.

== Other victims ==
The Gestapo executed a group of 50 of the recaptured prisoners representing almost all of the nationalities involved in the escape. Post-war investigations saw a number of those guilty of the murders tracked down, arrested and tried for their crimes.

Nationalities of the 50 executed
(United Kingdom) 21 British
(Canada) 6 Canadian
(Poland) 6 Polish
(Australia) 5 Australian
(South Africa) 3 South African
(New Zealand) 2 New Zealanders
(Norway) 2 Norwegian
(Belgium) 1 Belgian
(Czechoslovakia) 1 Czechoslovak
(France) 1 Frenchman
(Greece) 1 Greek
(Lithuania) 1 Lithuanian
