= John Pohe =

Royal New Zealand Air Force officer

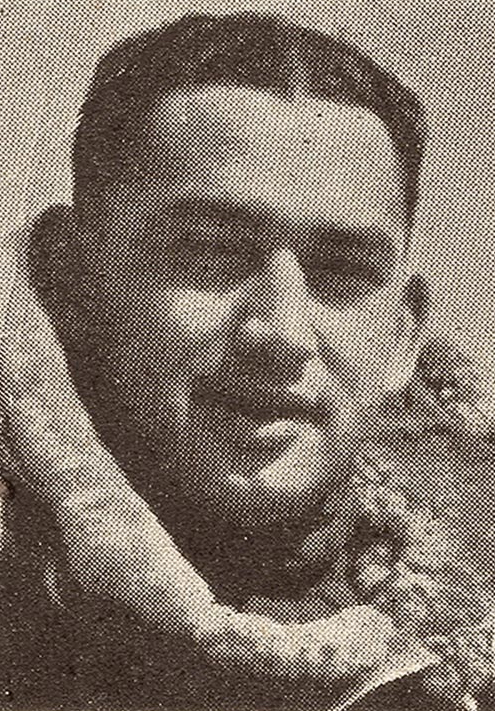
- Born: Porokoru Patapu Pohe; 10 December 1914; Wanganui, New Zealand
- Died: 31 March 1944 (aged 29); Halbau near Görlitz
- Burial place: Poznan Old Garrison Cemetery, Poland
- Military career
- Allegiance: New Zealand
- Branch: Royal New Zealand Air Force
- Service years: 1940–44
- Rank: Flying Officer
- Nicknames: Johnny, Lucky Johnny
- Service number: 402894
- Unit: No. 51 Squadron RAF
- Conflicts: World War II; Channel Front (POW)
- Awards: Mentioned in Despatches

Porokoru Patapu Pohe (10 December 1914 – 31 March 1944), commonly known as John Pohe, was a New Zealand Māori Royal New Zealand Air Force officer and bomber pilot who was taken prisoner during the Second World War. Notable for his part in the 'Great Escape' from Stalag Luft III in March 1944, he was one of the men recaptured and subsequently murdered by the Gestapo.

== Pre-War ==
Of Māori descent, Pohe was born Porokoru Patapu Pohe, the son of Whatarangi Ropoama Pohe and Honoria Maraea Pohe. He grew up on his parents' farm North of Taihape New Zealand with six sisters. He was educated at Putiki School, Turangarere School and Taihape District School, before Te Aute College where he was top of the class in nine subjects. After school he worked on the family farm and served two years in the Territorial Army with the Manawatu Mounted Rifles.

== Wartime service ==
Accepted for aircrew training after volunteering in 1939 he commenced training in September 1940 and flying training in November 1940. Pohe received his pilot’s flying brevet on 18 January 1941, the first Maori pilot in the Royal New Zealand Air Force, and in April sailed across the Pacific Ocean to Canada for further training before joining No. 10 Operational Training Unit at RAF Abingdon in May 1941. He was flying Armstrong Whitworth Whitley medium bombers and participated in an operational sortie on 21 July 1941 bombing a target near Paris becoming the first Maori to bomb a target in occupied Europe.

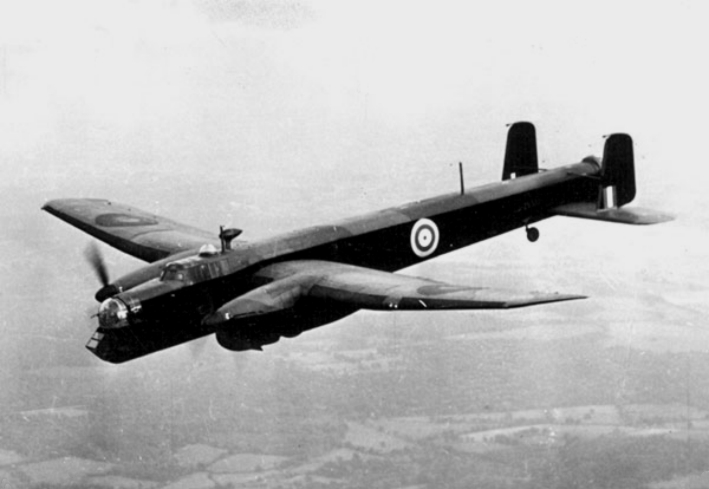
Whitley bomber

On 24 August 1941 he was posted to No. 51 Squadron RAF and flew 22 bombing operations, being promoted flight sergeant in October 1941 and on 27 February 1942 was pilot of an Armstrong Whitworth Whitley which dropped paratroops on the German radar station in what was known as the Bruneval Raid. In March 1942 he flew operations in support of the St Nazaire commando raid. On completion of his tour Pohe was posted to No. 24 Operational Training Unit at RAF Honeybourne as an instructor. In March 1943 he survived a crash when the wing of his Vickers Wellington bomber caught fire. Requesting a return to operational flying he joined No. 1663 Heavy Conversion Unit at RAF Rufforth in August 1943 learning to fly the Handley Page Halifax heavy bomber. On 20 September 1943 with his new crew he rejoined No. 51 Squadron RAF for a second tour of operations.

== Prisoner of war ==
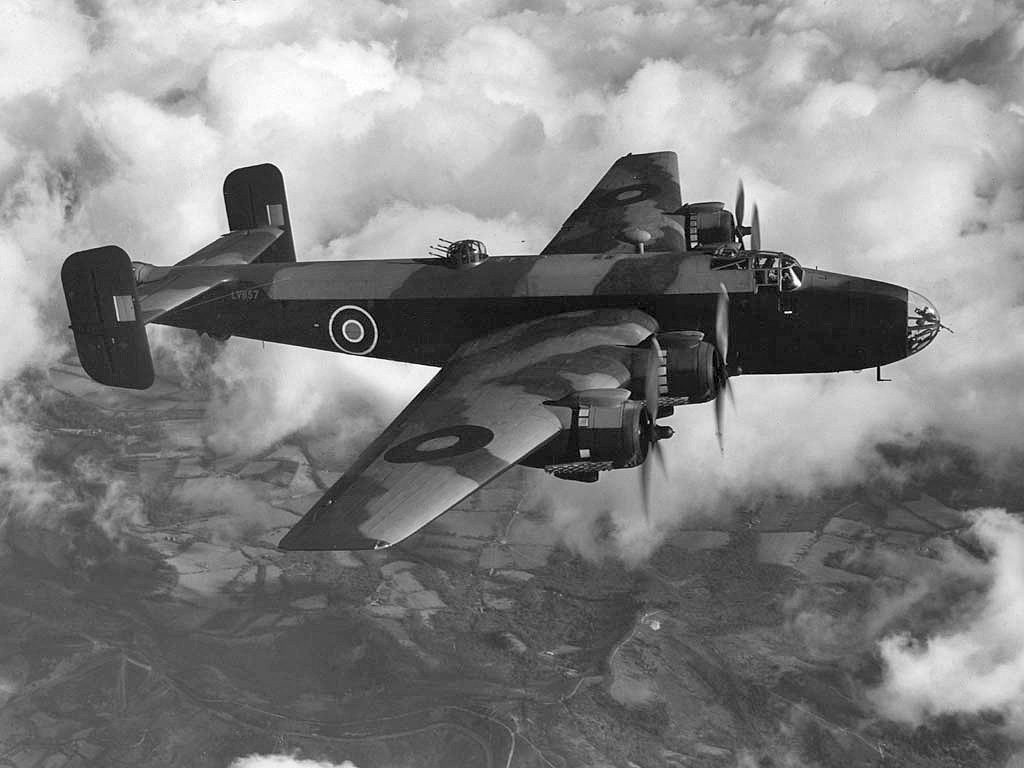
Handley Page Halifax bomber.

At 18:44 hours GMT on the evening of 22 September 1943 Pohe took off from RAF Snaith in Handley Page Halifax Mark II (aircraft serial number “JN901”) to bomb Hannover. Over the target area they received two serious hits by anti-aircraft fire and began to limp homewards but had to ditch in the English Channel. His entire crew escaped unhurt and floated in dinghies for 2 days before being spotted by a German aircraft and rescued by a German vessel, they were prisoners of war. Pohe arrived at Stalag Luft III on 6 October 1943 and in 1944 became involved in tunneling in the escape tunnel named “Dick”.

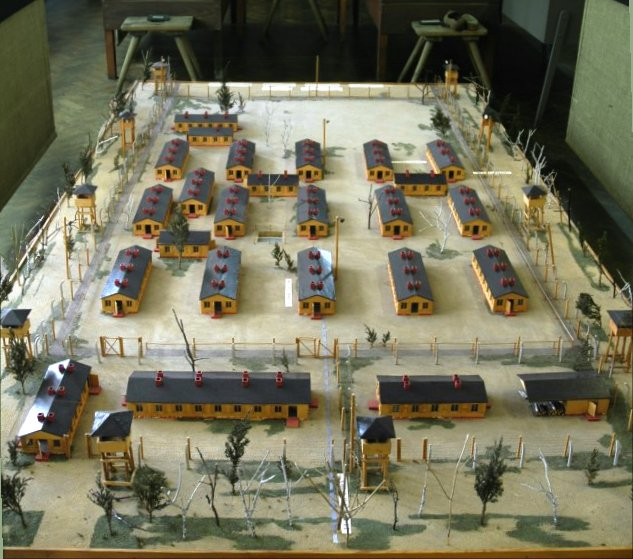
Model of Stalag Luft III prison camp.

== 'Great Escape' ==
For the Great Escape operation Pohe was one of the tunnellers and one of the 76 men who escaped the prison camp on the night of 24–25 March 1944, in the escape now famous as "the Great Escape". When the Germans discovered the escape they began extensive well planned manhunts. Al Hake and John Pohe struggled through the deep snow in the forests but were recaptured by local patrols their feet badly frostbitten and were initially held locally. Nineteen recaptured officers were loaded into a lorry the following day and moved to Görlitz prison under Gestapo control. Here the numbers of recaptured officers grew until thirty-five were held there. The prisoners were threatened with death and interrogated harshly but not physically. On 30 March 1944 two of the survivors saw three large sedans with ten Gestapo agents collect six officers, Ian Cross, Mike Casey, George Wiley, Al Hake, Tom Leigh and John Pohe. they were not seen again, their cremation urn labels stated that they died on 31 March 1944 and had been cremated at Görlitz. He was one of the 50 escapers executed and murdered by the Gestapo. His cremated ashes, originally buried at Sagan, are now buried in part of the Poznan Old Garrison Cemetery.

Pohe was amongst the 47 murdered officers named in the British and Commonwealth press when the story became public knowledge on or about 19–20 May 1944.

Memorial to "The Fifty" down the road toward Żagań

== Awards ==
His conspicuous bravery as a prisoner and escaper was recognized by a Mention in Despatches in the 1944 King's Birthday Honours, as none of the other relevant decorations then available could be awarded posthumously. It was published in a supplement to the London Gazette on 8 June 1944.

== Other victims ==
See Stalag Luft III murders

The Gestapo executed a group of 50 of the recaptured prisoners representing almost all of the nationalities involved in the escape.

Post-war investigations saw a number of those guilty of the murders tracked down, arrested and tried for their crimes.

Nationalities of the 50 executed
(United Kingdom) 21 British
(Canada) 6 Canadian
(Poland) 6 Polish
(Australia) 5 Australian
(South Africa) 3 South African
(New Zealand) 2 New Zealanders
(Norway) 2 Norwegian
(Belgium) 1 Belgian
(Czechoslovakia) 1 Czechoslovak
(France) 1 Frenchman
(Greece) 1 Greek
(Lithuania) 1 Lithuanian
