= Frank McKenna (RAF officer) =

Francis Peter McKenna
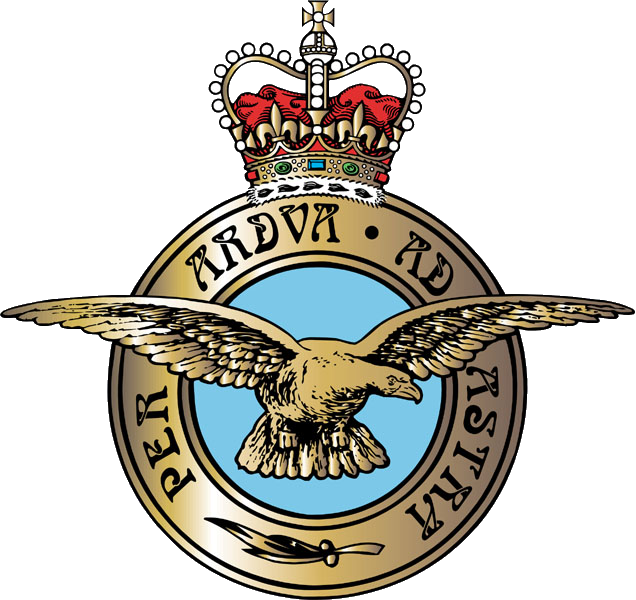
- Born: Francis Peter McKenna; 28 February 1906; Accrington, Lancashire
- Died: 14 June 1994 (aged 88); Blackpool, Lancashire
- Relatives: Eunice Naomi - wife
- Military career
- Allegiance: United Kingdom
- Branch: Royal Air Force
- Service years: 1943–1965
- Rank: Squadron Leader
- Nickname: Frank
- Service number: 189121
- Unit: Special Investigation Branch
- Conflicts: World War II: Channel Front
- Awards: Order of the British Empire

Francis Peter McKenna OBE (28 February 1906 – 14 February 1994) was a British Royal Air Force service police detective, deputy to Wilfred Bowes who ran the Special Investigation Branch investigation into the murders of recaptured officers who had escaped in the 'Great Escape' from Stalag Luft III in March 1944. McKenna personally arrested over 20 of the "Gestapo" agents involved in the murders.

== Pre-war life ==
McKenna was born in Accrington, Lancashire on 28 February 1906, one of six children of Margaret and police constable Francis McKenna. The family moved to Blackpool shortly after his birth when his father was transferred to the Borough of Blackpool Police Force, they resided at 2 Huntley Avenue, Layton. Educated at Sacred Heart School, Blackpool he and his younger brother John later joined the police force where they both became detective sergeants. Frank McKenna married on 30 December 1934 in Blackpool to Eunice Naomi.

With the outbreak of the second world war, McKenna, who had considerable civilian flying experience, was deemed to be in a reserved occupation due to his police service and was refused permission to join the RAF.

== World War II ==
When high losses in RAF Bomber Command saw the rules eased in 1943 he joined the RAF with service number 2212815 as an aircrew candidate and became a sergeant flight engineer, eventually flying over 30 Lancaster bomber missions throughout Europe. He completed a tour of operations as a flight sergeant with No. 15 Squadron RAF, and No. 622 Squadron RAF and was commissioned pilot officer on 24 November 1944. During his time in aircrew at RAF Squires Gate McKenna met and became friendly with Flight Lieutenant Edgar Humphreys and Flying Officer Robert Stewart who were amongst the officers murdered following the Great Escape.

Shortly before Christmas 1944 he transferred to Princes Gate Court, London to the Special Investigation Branch and seventeen months after the murders in Stalag Luft III, McKenna flew to Germany to investigate what is still the worst war crime against British nationals. He spoke little German and was teamed up with an interpreter Warrant Officer Williams. His task was complicated by the chaos and corruption of the nationally controlled zones of post-war Germany.

== The "Great Escape" murders ==
As was normal for a number of Royal Air Force personnel held prisoner of war in Germany during World War II attempting to escape was considered both a duty and a pastime. The German authorities had to expend considerable resource in keeping the men captive and recovering escapees. Seventy-six men escaped from the prison camp "the Great Escape" on the night of 24–25 March 1944 in the escape which is now famous. All but three were tracked down and recaptured. A decision was made by German High Command to execute 50 of the recaptured officers as an example. SS-Gruppenfuhrer Arthur Nebe in Berlin picked which of the men were to be shot and the Gestapo carried out the executions.

Memorial to "The Fifty" down the road toward Żagań.

See Stalag Luft III murders

The British government learned of the deaths from a routine visit in May 1944 to Stalag Luft III in the province of Lower Silesia near the town of Sagan (now Żagań in Poland), by the neutral Swiss authorities as the protecting power; the Foreign Secretary Anthony Eden announced the news to the House of Commons on 19 May 1944. Shortly after the announcement the Senior British Officer of the camp, Group Captain Herbert Massey, was repatriated to England due to ill health. Upon his return, he informed the Government about the circumstances of the escape and the reality of the murder of the recaptured escapees. Eden updated Parliament on 23 June, promising that, at the end of the war, those responsible would be brought to exemplary justice.

== The investigation ==
Assigned to lead the investigation on the ground in Germany by Wing Commander Wilfred Bowes, McKenna brought together a small, independent and dedicated team. Never larger than five officers and 14 NCOs it evolved into a copybook civilian detective operation. He was promoted flying officer on 24 May 1945.

On 3 July 1945 McKenna was appointed Deputy Assistant Provost Marshal He moved to Rinteln in Germany in late 1945 with Wilfred Bowes and the Special Investigation Branch and commenced investigations on the ground, travelling to Soviet occupied Poland and Czechoslovakia, travelling into Berlin and even flying to Moscow to interrogate a man he wanted who would not be released by the Soviet NKVD secret police due to warrants for mass murder in Russia.

As the investigation started seventeen months after the alleged crimes had been committed it was a cold case. Worse, according to an account of the investigation, the perpetrators "belonged to a body, the Secret State Police or Gestapo, which held and exercised every facility to provide its members with false identities and forged identification papers immediately they were ordered to go on the run at the moment of national surrender." McKenna is recorded as a man of impressive stature, an extremely effective interrogator, he was promoted squadron leader during the investigation. and an officer leading armed raids on the hiding places of desperate war criminals.

The team from the RAF relentlessly tracked down, arrested, and interrogated the alleged war criminals responsible for the murders. Work by Wilfred Bowes, Frank McKenna and the team saw a number of those guilty of the murders arrested and tried for their crimes. Others were dead or in Soviet custody facing capital charges for other crimes .

McKenna himself arrested more than 20 former Gestapo officers, the largest single total out of 69 men brought to justice. A few committed suicide, but most were convicted of murder and imprisoned or executed.

== Later career ==
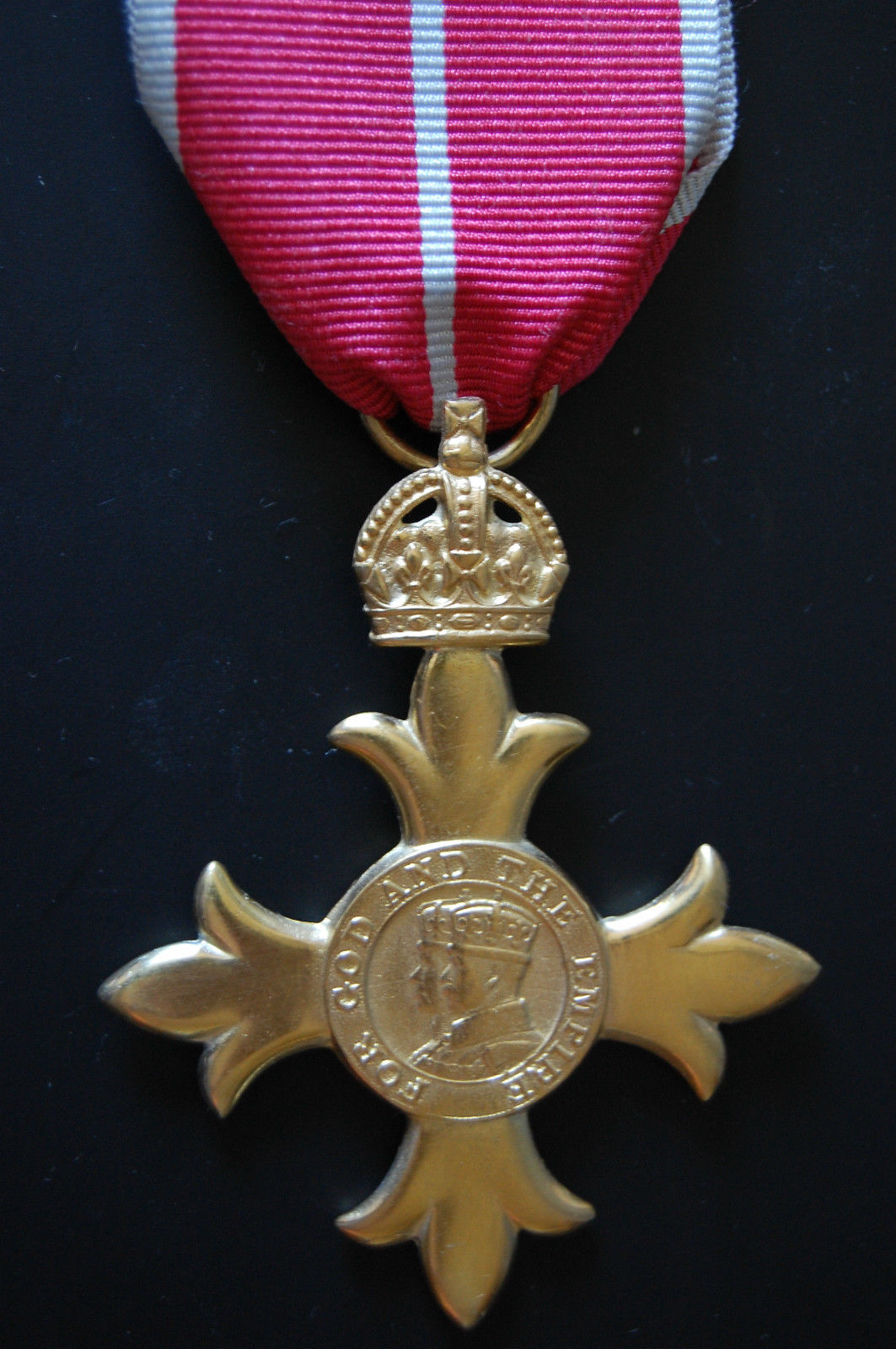
OBE - An Officer level of the Order of the British Empire (gold colour).

When the Royal Air Force was reduced in size post-war McKenna accepted a "Regular Service" commission as a flying officer with the "Provost Branch" effective from 24 November 1945, and on 1 January 1948 was appointed Assistant to Provost Marshal. On 10 June 1948 he was awarded an OBE (Military Division) as Officer of the Most Excellent Order of the British Empire in the rank of Squadron Leader for his work on the Stalag Luft III murders investigation.

On 17 November 1948 Wilfred Bowes learned of the official British government position that no further trials of war criminals would be taking place and formally placed on record his disagreement with the policy writing to the Provost Marshal of the Royal Air Force.

The formalities of transferring from wartime service with the Royal Air Force Volunteer Reserve as a squadron leader to "Regular Service Commission" with the Royal Air Force "Provost Branch" as a flying officer were completed for McKenna on 17 June 1949, and on 9 June 1952 he continued his service with a "Short Service Commission".

On 25 August 1954 McKenna was posted to Cyprus and appointed Assistant Provost Marshal. Serving in there during the EOKA emergency McKenna's service was extended in 1956, again in 1958, and further in 1959.

McKenna's extremely effective service in Cyprus was recognized by a Mention in Despatches in October 1958.

He took retirement from the "Provost Branch" as a flight lieutenant on 28 February 1965.

McKenna joined the Ministry of Defence where he carried out background checks on potential service personnel and in 1971 aged 65 he finally retired, working occasionally as a commercial security consultant and in later years living at Ansdell, Lytham St Annes.

== Awards ==
- Order of the British Empire (Officer) Military Division on 10 June 1948.
