= Jack Grisman =

British air force pilot (1914–1944)

William Jack Grisman
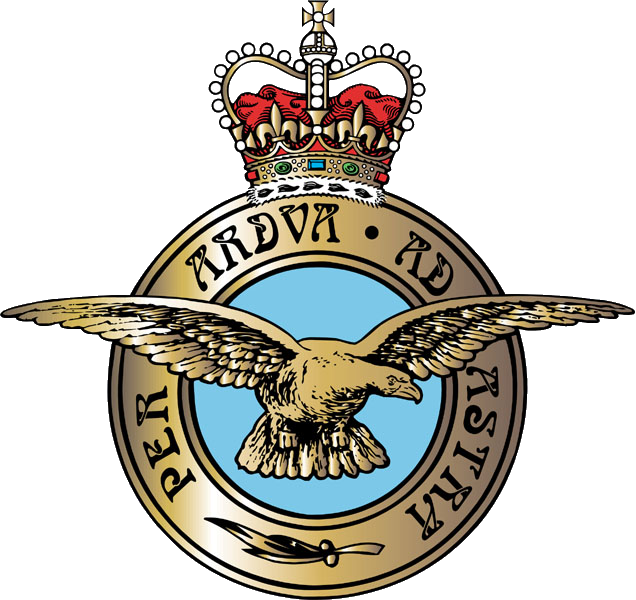
- Born: William Jack Grisman; 30 August 1914; Hereford, England
- Died: 6 April 1944 (aged 29) between Görlitz and Breslau
- Burial place: Poznan Old Garrison Cemetery, Poland
- Relatives: Marie (nee Merchant)
- Military career
- Allegiance: United Kingdom
- Branch: Royal Air Force
- Service years: 1931–1944
- Rank: Flight Lieutenant
- Nickname: Jack
- Service number: 45148
- Units: No. 28 Squadron RAF; No. 99 Squadron RAF; No. 109 Squadron RAF
- Conflicts: World War II: Channel Front (POW)
- Awards: Mentioned in Despatches

William Jack Grisman (30 August 1914 – 6 April 1944) was a British Vickers Wellington bomber crew member who was taken prisoner during the Second World War. He took part in the 'Great Escape' from Stalag Luft III in March 1944, but was one of the men re-captured and subsequently shot by the Gestapo.

== Pre-war life ==
Grisman was born in Hereford Herefordshire the eldest son of a postman, Willliam Charles Grisman and his wife Gertrude Ellen. He was educated in the local council school where he matured rapidly towards the end of his time and became very keen on swimming and rugby football. He wanted to see some of the world, play sports and work in engineering and quickly identified the Royal Air Force as a good opportunity so enlisted as an aircraft apprentice on 13 January 1931 to train at No. 1 School of Technical Training RAF, RAF Halton he graduated in December 1933 as an aircraftman 2nd class (service number 565127) posted to No. 10 Squadron RAF at RAF Boscombe Down to service Handley Page Heyford bombers. By January 1936 he was a leading aircraftman posted to Basra in Iraqas an engine fitter but in November 1936 he was appointed driver with the British Embassy in Baghdad. In early 1938 Grisman joined No. 28 Squadron RAF as a rigger and fitter but also an air gunner on what was then known as the North West Frontier. He enjoyed flying and applied for aircrew duties and qualified being posted to England in December 1938 to train at RAF Mildenhall as an "Observer", an aircrew role which combined the duties of navigator and bomb aimer. On 27 July 1939 he joined No. 99 Squadron which was flying Vickers Wellington bombers from RAF Mildenhall.

== War service ==
Serving operationally as an observer with No. 99 Squadron RAF based at RAF Newmarket where he flew with Percy Charles Pickard and was involved in some early missions to drop propaganda leaflets on Germany before being promoted sergeant and recognised as a potential officer. Grisman commenced officer training in June 1940, he completed his tour of operations with the squadron being Mentioned in Despatches on 6 October 1940, and was commissioned as a pilot officer on 20 December 1940.

In late December 1940 Grisman was posted to RAF Boscombe Down where experienced navigators were required for testing and developing the blind approach aid that would eventually help many night bomber crews as they struggled to land at airfields in bad weather. He was to join No. 109 Squadron RAF flying Avro Anson and Vickers Wellington aircraft, the squadron was engaged during the next two years in development of radio counter-measures and also new radar aids, notably the blind bombing system known as Oboe later used so successfully by the Pathfinder Force.

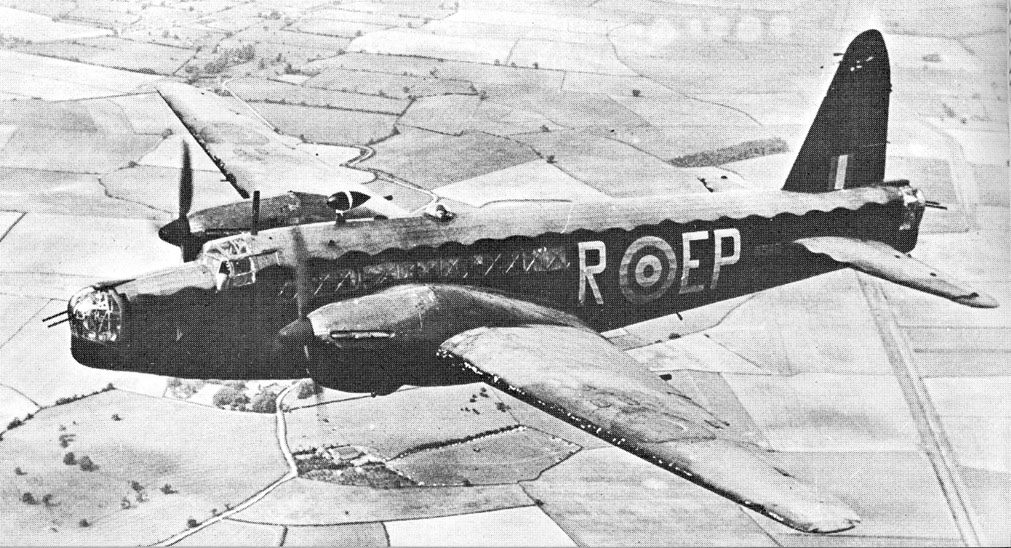
The Merlin-engined Wellington Mark II. This aircraft actually belongs to No. 104 Sqn. Notice the criss-cross geodesic construction through the perspex fuselage panels.

He was promoted to flying officer on 20 December 1941 (with seniority from 11 December 1941).

== Prisoner of war ==
At 1830 on the evening of 5 November 1941 Grisman took off in a Wellington Mark Ic bomber (serial number T2562) from Boscombe Down on a Special Duties mission to investigate the capabilities of the German radar chain sites along the west coast of France. The pilot of the aircraft was Flying Officer Leslie George Bull who later also participated in the Great Escape. Over the French port of Lorient the starboard engine failed and then lost its propeller. Unable to continue Bull held the aircraft level while his crew of five baled out and then followed – the crew were taken prisoner on landing by parachute in France. Becoming a prisoner of war he was interrogated by the Luftwaffe before being sent to Stalag Luft I Barth where he and Bull immediately became involved in escape attempts involving tunnelling out of the camp where he made himself a general nuisance to the German guards (a popular pastime amongst bored RAF prisoners) and there he brewed illegal potato skin alcohol for Christmas celebrations. At Stalag Luft I Bull met Roger Bushell during various tunnelling escape attempts, Bushell later masterminded the Great Escape. Grisman and Bull were part of the group with Bushell who were sent to Stalag Luft III in the province of Lower Silesia near the town of Sagan (now Żagań in Poland). He was an enthusiastic tunneller.

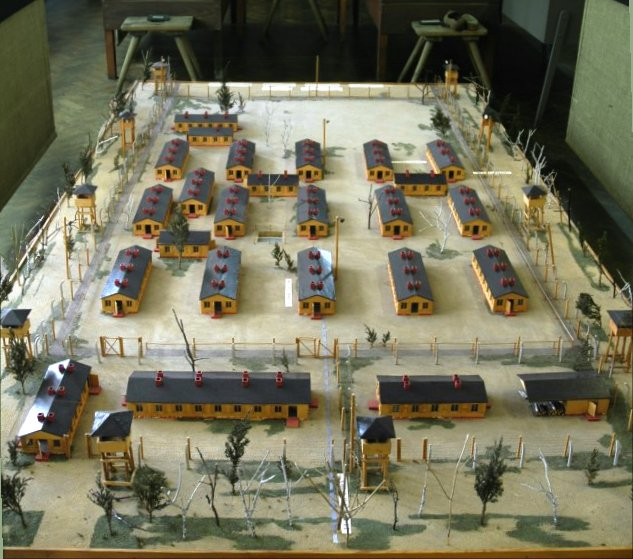
Model of Stalag Luft III prison camp.

== 'Great Escape' ==
As prisoner of war No. 673 at Stalag Luft III Grisman completed correspondence courses in Mathematics and English with the University of London, and by early 1943 had also gained qualifications in French Language, Mechanics and advanced mathematics. For the Great Escape operation Grisman was one of the leading tunnellers. and was designated as a "marshal", one of the dozen men appointed to wait in the forest after escaping to collect a pre-selected group of ten men who would then be led westwards as initial stage guides Grisman's group were known as the "hard arsers" because they planned to walk alone the entire trip homewards rather than catching trains. He was one of the 76 men who escaped the prison camp on the night of 24–25 March 1944 in the escape now famous as "the Great Escape".

The alarm sounded on the discover of the escape attempt after he had been outside the wire for only 50 minutes and not surprisingly Grisman was arrested quite quickly to the south of the camp on the road to Görlitz by the Germans and arrived at the collecting point for recaptured officers in Görlitz prison on 28 March 1944. During interrogation he was told that his wife would never see him again. At Görlitz prison on the morning of 6 April 1944 Tony Bethell heard a truck arrive and saw three Germans in uniform call out the names of Denys Street, Neville McGarr, Sandy Gunn, Jack Grisman, Harold Milford and John F Williams. No firm evidence was ever found of the fate of these six men and their records were marked "killed at a place unknown, on or after 6 April 1944".

Grisman was one of the 50 escapers executed and murdered by the Gestapo. He was cremated at Breslau. Originally his remains were buried at Sagan, he is now buried in part of the Poznan Old Garrison Cemetery.

Memorial to "The Fifty" down the road toward Żagań (Grisman is on the left)

In total Wilhelm Scharpwinkel coordinated the murder of around thirty of the Great Escapers.

Grisman's name was amongst those in the list of the murdered prisoners which was published in the press in the UK and Commonwealth countries when news broke on or about 20 May 1944.

His photograph is shown in conjunction with that of a relative here and he is also commemorated on the Dunsfold War Memorial website.

As "Halton brat" or an "old Haltonian", a graduate of the RAF Halton aircraft apprentice scheme, he is commemorated by name in the stained glass window in St. George's Church, RAF Halton dedicated to those murdered following the "Great Escape".

== Personal life ==
Grisman was married and survived by his wife, Marie M. Grisman.

== Awards ==
Mentioned in despatches for conspicuous gallantry as a prisoner of war (none of the other relevant decorations then available could be awarded posthumously). It was published in a supplement to the London Gazette on 8 June 1944.

== Other victims ==
See Stalag Luft III murders

The Gestapo executed a group of 50 of the recaptured prisoners representing almost all of the nationalities involved in the escape. Post-war investigations saw a number of those guilty of the murders tracked down, arrested and tried for their crimes.

Nationalities of the 50 executed
(United Kingdom) 21 British
(Canada) 6 Canadian
(Poland) 6 Polish
(Australia) 5 Australian
(South Africa) 3 South African
(New Zealand) 2 New Zealanders
(Norway) 2 Norwegian
(Belgium) 1 Belgian
(Czechoslovakia) 1 Czechoslovak
(France) 1 Frenchman
(Greece) 1 Greek
(Lithuania) 1 Lithuanian

== Bibliography ==
- Ted Barris (2014). The Great Escape. Dundurn Publishing. ISBN 978-1459728448.
- Tim Carroll (2005). The Great Escape from Stalag Luft III. Pocket Publishing. ISBN 1416505318.
- Simon Read (2012). Human Game. Constable. ISBN 978-1-4721-1262-0.
- Sean Feast (2015). The Last of the 39-ers. Grub Street. ISBN 978-1909166158.
- Jonathan F Vance (2000). A Gallant Company. Pacifica Military. ISBN 978-0-935-55347-5.
- William Ash; Brendan Foley (2005). Under the Wire: The Wartime Memoir of a Spitfire Pilot, Legendary Escape Artist and 'cooler King'. Bantam. ISBN 978-0-593-05408-6.
- Paul Brickhill (2004). The Great Escape. W.W. Norton & Company. ISBN 978-0-393-32579-9.
- Alan Burgess (1990). The Longest Tunnel: The True Story of World War II's Great Escape. Naval Institute Press. ISBN 978-1-59114-097-9.
- Albert P. Clark (2005). 33 Months as a POW in Stalag Luft III: A World War II Airman Tells His Story. Fulcrum Pub. ISBN 978-1-55591-536-0.
- Arthur A. Durand (1 January 1989). Stalag Luft III: The Secret Story. Patrick Stephens Limited. ISBN 978-1-85260-248-2.
- William R Chorley (1992). RAF Bomber Command Losses, Volume 2. Midland Counties. ISBN 0-904597-87-3.
- Allen Andrews (1976). Exemplary Justice. Harrap. ISBN 0-245-52775-3.
- Vance, Jonathan F (2000). A Gallant Company: The Men of the Great Escape. Pacifica Military History; (Mar 2001). p. 41. ISBN 978-0-935-55347-5.
