= Ian Cross (RAF officer) =

Ian Kingston Pembroke Cross
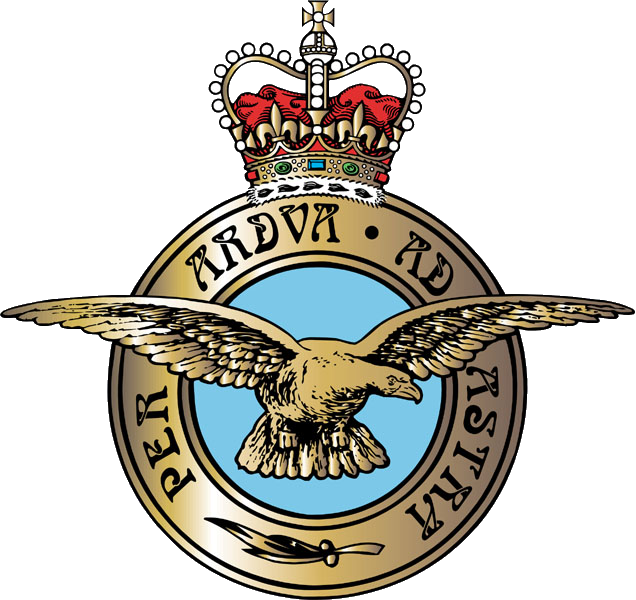
- Born: Ian Kingston Pembroke Cross; 4 April 1918; Cosham, Hampshire
- Died: 31 March 1944 (aged 25); Halbau near Görlitz
- Burial place: Poznan Old Garrison Cemetery, Poland
- Military career
- Allegiance: United Kingdom
- Branch: Royal Air Force
- Service years: 1936–44
- Rank: Squadron Leader
- Service number: 39305
- Units: No. 38 Squadron RAF, No. 103 Squadron RAF
- Conflicts: World War II: Channel Front (POW)
- Awards: Distinguished Flying Cross, Mentioned in Despatches

Ian Kingston Pembroke Cross DFC (4 April 1918 – 31 March 1944), was a British Royal Air Force officer and bomber pilot who was taken prisoner during the Second World War. Notable for his part in the 'Great Escape' from Stalag Luft III in March 1944 when he was one of the men recaptured and subsequently murdered by the Gestapo.

== Pre-War ==
Ian Cross was born in Cosham, Hampshire the son of Jeannie and Pembroke Cross a successful chartered surveyor, estate agent and valuer. His older brother Kenneth later became Air Chief Marshal Sir Kenneth Cross, AOC-in-C Bomber and Transport Command RAF. Ian Cross was a frail child and had a home tutor due to his early poor health. In 1918 the family moved to Hayling Island and there his health began to improve rapidly. He was educated at Churchers School, Petersfield until 1936 where he was recognized as a track athlete and Rugby football player and as a member of the school Officer Training Corps. Ian Cross left school and followed his older brother Kenneth into the Royal Air Force to train as a pilot.

== Early service career ==
Cross joined the Royal Air Force as an officer cadet on 12 October 1936 receiving his initial flight training at a civil flying school at Hanworth. He was commissioned as an acting pilot officer on 21 December 1936 with service number 39305 joining No. 38 Squadron RAF based at RAF Marham in Norfolk flying Fairey Hendon bombers and being confirmed as pilot officer on 13 October 1937 The squadron began to convert to Vickers Wellington heavy bombers in January 1939 and Cross was promoted flying officer on 12 May 1939 and was captain of the station Rugby football team.

== Wartime service ==
His first operational sortie (mission) was on 3 December 1939, an anti-shipping strike on German vessels near Heligoland. On the night of 20 February 1940 on a search for enemy shipping his bomber Vickers Wellington Mark IA (serial number P2526") flown by Flight Lieutenant M Nolan, (Cross being the second pilot) ran out of fuel on their return and the crew had to jump by parachute leaving the aircraft to crash. Soon afterwards Cross was appointed "first pilot" and he went on to complete 34 operations (missions) and finish his tour of operational duty. Posted to No. 11 Operational Training Unit based at RAF Bassingbourn he was unhappy as a flying instructor and pressed for a return to operational flying. He was promoted flight lieutenant on 3 September 1940 Cross was awarded a Distinguished Flying Cross on 13 September 1940 for his bravery during his first tour of operations with No. 38 Squadron RAF In August 1941 Cross succeeded in his aim to return to operational flying and was posted to No. 103 Squadron RAF to fly Vickers Wellington bombers. He flew sixteen further missions and became "B" flight commander, promoted temporary squadron leader on 1 December 1941

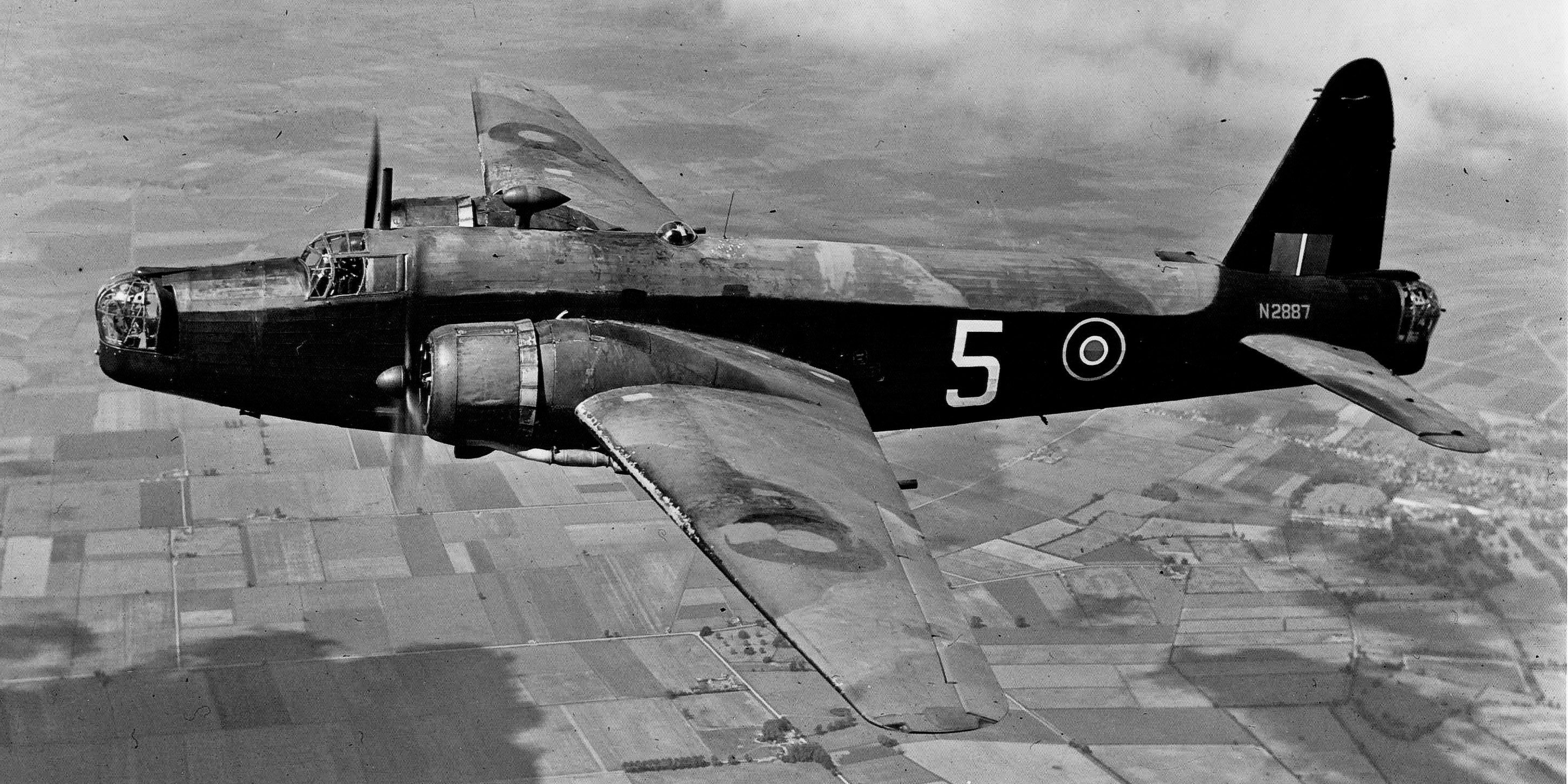
Wellington bomber.

== Prisoner of war ==
On 12 February 1942 the Royal Air Force mounted a series of large scale operations to attack the three capital warships of the German fleet which had broken out of harbor at Brest known officially as Operation Fuller but better known as the Channel Dash. Amongst the bombers hunting the warships was a Vickers Wellington Mark Ic of No. 103 Squadron RAF flown by Squadron Leader Ian Cross. Unsuited to daylight operations the RAF were using almost everything they had available to try to sink the warships. Cross took off from RAF Elsham Wolds at 1452 hours on that afternoon. His aircraft was hit by light anti-aircraft fire from German Naval units and he had to "ditch" (crash land at sea) 40 miles off Rotterdam where two of his crew of six drowned when they were unable to get to the life boat. Twenty four hours later the four survivors were rescued by German air-sea-rescue.

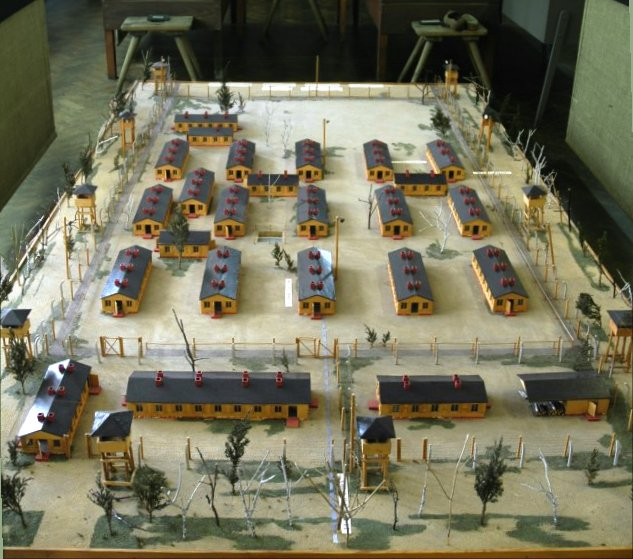
Model of Stalag Luft III prison camp.

Cross was taken into captivity becoming prisoner of war No. 189 at Oflag XXI-B at Szubin in German-occupied Poland where he became acquainted with seasoned escapers such as Roger Bushell, Cyril Swain and Bill Ash and became an accomplished tunneller. He was one of the "troublesome" prisoners moved by the Germans to the reputedly escape-proof Stalag Luft III where he continued his activities. In one attempt he jumped aboard a German truck leaving the compound with a load of pine trunks and branches which had been cut by Russian forced labourers but was caught before the truck was outside of the wire fences.

== 'Great Escape' ==
For the Great Escape operation Cross was one of the primary tunnellers and also oversaw and controlled the "penguin" team for the dispersal of the many tons of sandy earth excavated during the tunneling operations - much of it hidden beneath the floor of the camp theatre via a trap door constructed for the purpose beneath seat No. 13 working with Jimmy James. He was one of the 76 men who escaped the prison camp on the night of 24–25 March 1944, in the escape now famous as "the Great Escape". When the Germans discovered the escape they began extensive well planned manhunts. Ian Cross was one of the prisoners recaptured relatively quickly by local patrols and were initially held locally. Nineteen recaptured officers were loaded into a lorry the following day and moved to Görlitz prison under Gestapo control. Here the numbers of recaptured officers grew until thirty-five were held there. The prisoners were threatened with death and interrogated harshly but not physically. On 30 March 1944 two of the survivors saw three large sedans with ten Gestapo agents collect six officers, Ian Cross, Mike Casey, George Wiley, Al Hake, Tom Leigh and John Pohe. they were not seen again, their cremation urn labels stated that they died on 31 March 1944 and had been cremated at Görlitz. He was one of the 50 escapers executed and murdered by the Gestapo. Originally cremated and buried at Żagań, he is now buried in part of the Poznań Old Garrison Cemetery. where his parents chose the inscription "Faithful unto death, To his God and Country" for his headstone.

Post-war investigation found that a Gestapo agent named Lux led the squad who shot the group of six recaptured airmen beside the autobahn near Halbau on the instructions of a senior officer named Scharpwinkel.

He was amongst the 47 murdered officers named in the British and Commonwealth press when the story became public knowledge on or about 19–20 May 1944 The Glasgow Herald of 19 May 1944 published an early list naming several officers including Cross

Memorial to "The Fifty" down the road toward Żagań

== Awards ==
Distinguished Flying Cross awarded on 13 September 1940 for his bravery with No. 38 Squadron RAF

Mention in Despatches His conspicuous bravery as a prisoner and escaper was recognized by a Mention in Despatches as none of the other relevant decorations then available could be awarded posthumously. It was published in a supplement to the London Gazette on 8 June 1944.

== Other victims ==
See Stalag Luft III murders

The Gestapo executed a group of 50 of the recaptured prisoners representing almost all of the nationalities involved in the escape.

Post-war investigations saw a number of those guilty of the murders tracked down, arrested and tried for their crimes.

Nationalities of the 50 executed
(United Kingdom) 21 British
(Canada) 6 Canadian
(Poland) 6 Polish
(Australia) 5 Australian
(South Africa) 3 South African
(New Zealand) 2 New Zealanders
(Norway) 2 Norwegian
(Belgium) 1 Belgian
(Czechoslovakia) 1 Czechoslovak
(France) 1 Frenchman
(Greece) 1 Greek
(Lithuania) 1 Lithuanian
