= Max Wielen =

German Kripo official (born 1883)

Max Ernst Gustav Friedrich Wielen (born 3 March 1883) was the Kripo police chief at Breslau. After the war, he was sentenced to life imprisonment by a British military court for his complicity in the Stalag Luft III murders. However, Wielen's sentence was later reduced to 15 years, and he was released on health grounds on 24 October 1952, after having served about 7.5 years in custody.
