= Wilfred Bowes =

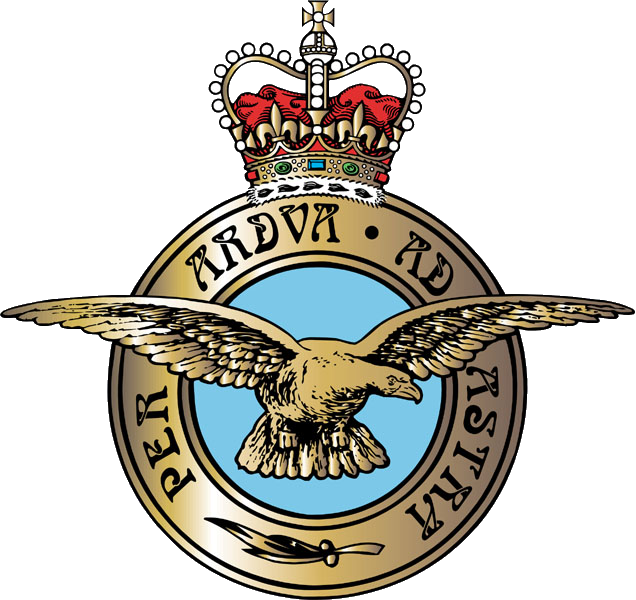
- Born: Wilfred Bowes; 19 February 1904; West Hartlepool, Durham
- Died: 6 June 1970 (aged 66); Hounslow, London
- Relatives: Annie(nee Fisher) - wife
- Military career
- Allegiance: United Kingdom
- Branch: Royal Air Force
- Service years: 1919–1946
- Rank: Wing Commander
- Nickname: Freddie
- Unit: Special Investigation Branch
- Commands: Special Investigation Branch
- Conflicts: World War II: Channel Front
- Awards: Order of the British Empire

Wilfred Bowes, OBE (19 February 1904 – 6 June 1970), was a British Royal Air Force service police detective who ran the Special Investigation Branch from 1944. He headed the investigation into the murders of recaptured officers who had escaped in the 'Great Escape' from Stalag Luft III in March 1944.

== Pre-war life ==
Bowes was born 1903 in Heaton Newcastle upon Tyne, Tyne and Wear the second son of John Bowes a Clark, his mother Elizaberth Cox. His Father died when he was young. He had 2 brothers and 4 sisters

== Early Royal Air Force career ==
Bowes is reported to have joined the RAF under-age in 1918 and seen service in the Chanak Peninsula in Turkey. His formal service enlistment in the Royal Air Force dates from August 1919 as Aircraftman 2nd Class (service number 334463). During the 1920s he became a Royal Air Force policeman and married Amelia "Annie" Fisher in Bromley, Kent in late 1924 In the late 1920s as a Corporal Bowes transferred to the Royal Air Force Police. He served at RAF Halton from 4 March 1932, after promotion to sergeant. His daughter Joan and sons John and Brian were born during this period, John and Brian, both were to have long careers with the RAF Police themselves. Bowes was promoted to flight sergeant in 1935 and in that rank was awarded the Royal Air Force Long Service and Good Conduct Medal in January 1938 (effective 20 August 1937). He was a founder member of the Special Investigation Branch conducting criminal investigations for the service. He was promoted Warrant Officer on 1 December 1938.

== World War II ==
Bowes was commissioned directly to Flying Officer (service number 43664) on 16 May 1940 (with seniority from 21 March 1940), and on 16 May 1941 confirmed in the rank. On 1 September 1941 he was appointed Deputy Assistant Provost Marshal. He was promoted temporary Flight Lieutenant on 1 March 1942, and confirmed in that rank on 3 November 1944.

It is reported that he investigated the murder of Flight Sergeant Ronald Murphy of No. 2879 Squadron RAF Regiment, killed with a service issue rifle on 4 February 1944 by Aircraftman Sidney Delasalle who was hanged at Durham Prison in April 1944.

In the summer of 1944, Bowes was in the process of taking over Special Investigation Branch at Princes Gate Court in Central London. By Christmas he was joined by Squadron Leader Frank McKenna a former civilian police detective and who had flown operationally as a member of RAF Bomber Command aircrew.

== The "Great Escape" murders ==
As was normal for a number of Royal Air Force personnel held prisoner of war in Germany during World War II attempting to escape was considered both a duty and a pastime. The German authorities had to expend considerable resource in keeping the men captive and recovering escapees. Seventy-six men escaped from the prison camp "the Great Escape" on the night of 24–25 March 1944 in the escape which is now famous. All but three were tracked down and recaptured. A decision was made by German High Command to execute 50 of the recaptured officers as an example. SS-Gruppenfuhrer Arthur Nebe in Berlin picked which of the men were to be shot and the Gestapo carried out the executions.

Memorial to "The Fifty" down the road toward Żagań.

See Stalag Luft III murders

The British government learned of the deaths from a routine visit in May 1944 to Stalag Luft III in the province of Lower Silesia near the town of Sagan (now Żagań in Poland), by the neutral Swiss authorities as the protecting power; the Foreign Secretary Anthony Eden announced the news to the House of Commons on 19 May 1944. Shortly after the announcement the Senior British Officer of the camp, Group Captain Herbert Massey, was repatriated to England due to ill health. Upon his return, he informed the Government about the circumstances of the escape and the reality of the murder of the recaptured escapees. Eden updated Parliament on 23 June, promising that, at the end of the war, those responsible would be brought to exemplary justice.

== The investigation ==
On 1 July 1945 Bowes was promoted Squadron Leader, this was confirmed later. He moved to Rinteln in Germany in late 1945 as officer commanding Special Investigation Branch within British Air Forces of Occupation, and commenced investigations on the ground, travelling to Soviet occupied Poland and Czechoslovakia, travelling into Berlin and even flying to Moscow to interrogate a man he wanted who would not be released by the Soviet NKVD secret police due to warrants for mass murder in Russia.

Bowes and his deputy Frank McKenna headed the 15-man investigation detachment of the Special Investigation Branch of the Royal Air Force Police given the assignment to tracking down the killers of the 50 officers. The investigation started seventeen months after the alleged crimes had been committed, making it a cold case. Worse, according to an account of the investigation, the perpetrators "belonged to a body, the Secret State Police or Gestapo, which held and exercised every facility to provide its members with false identities and forged identification papers immediately they were ordered to go on the run at the moment of national surrender." Bowes is recorded as an extremely effective interrogator, and an officer leading armed raids on the hiding places of desperate war criminals.

The team from the RAF relentlessly tracked down, arrested, and interrogated the alleged war criminals responsible for the murders. Work by Bowes, Frank McKenna and the team saw a number of those guilty of the murders tried for their crimes. Others were dead or in Soviet custody facing capital charges for other crimes .

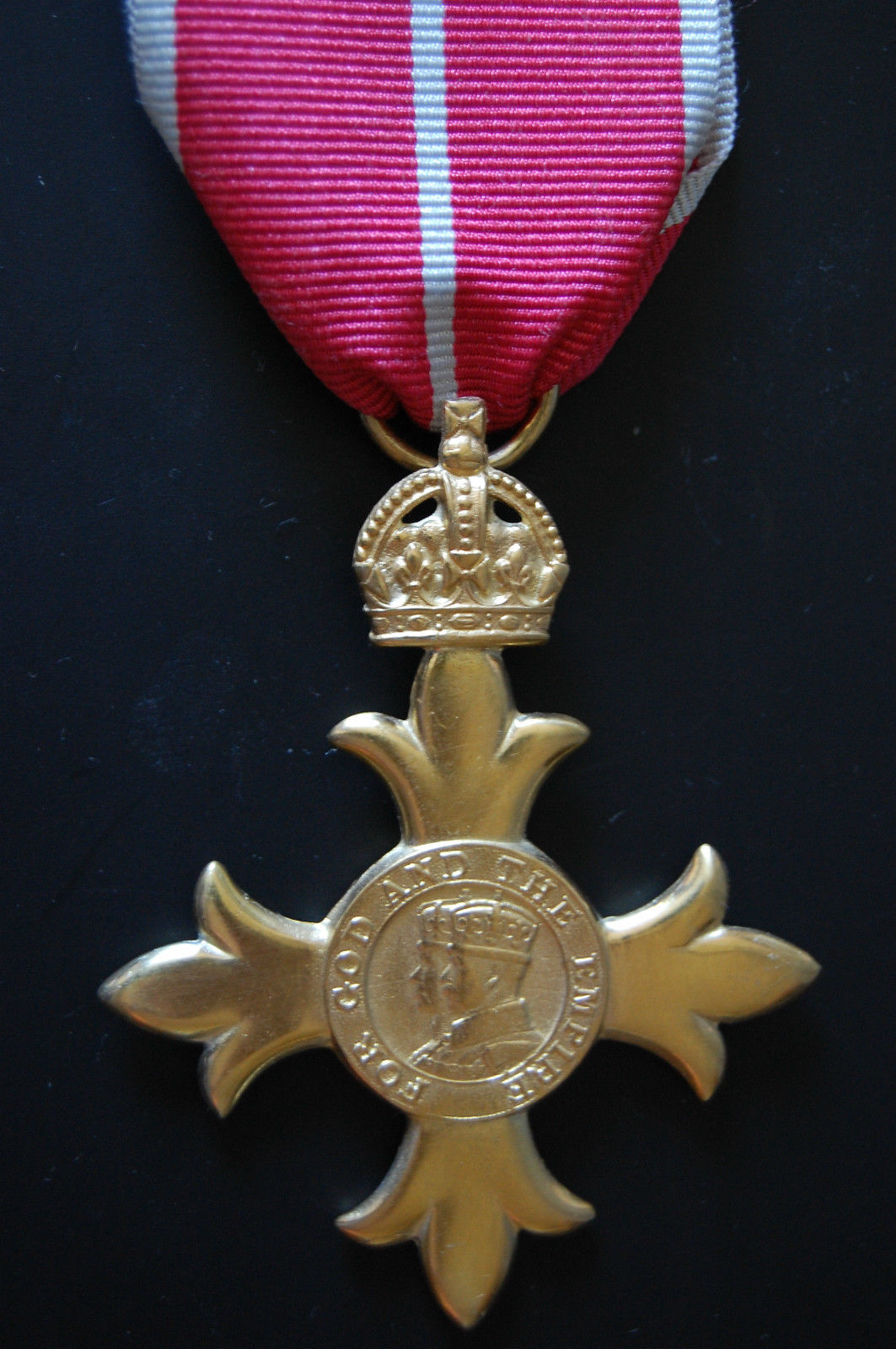
OBE - An Officer level of the Order of the British Empire (gold colour).

Bowes' investigations continued through 1947 and he maintained active links with war crimes investigators in Moscow in the hope of securing the extradition of the man he had interrogated, but in October 1947 the Russians confirmed that he had died.

== Post-war ==
On 1 January 1947 he was formally transferred to the RAF Provost Branch, and granted a permanent commission as Squadron Leader on 20 March 1947 (with seniority from 1 September 1945) serving with the Royal Air Force Provost Branch. Bowes was promoted Wing Commander with RAF Provost Branch on 1 July 1947. On 10 June 1948 he was awarded an OBE (Military Division) as Officer of the Most Excellent Order of the British Empire in the rank of Wing Commander for his work on the Stalag Luft III murders investigation.

On 17 November 1948 Bowes learned of the official British government position that no further trials of war criminals would be taking place and formally placed on record his disagreement with the policy writing to the Provost Marshal of the Royal Air Force and in March 1950 he learned that a Gestapo agent involved in the deaths of the airmen had been acquitted by a German court after trial for killing East European slave labourers and worked to get fresh prosecutions commenced. In September 1954 another Gestapo officer was acquitted in a German court of the murder of four of the "Great Escapers" in the Danzig area, Bowes launched a major push and had the result appealed and a prison sentence awarded.

Bowes retired on 12 June 1954 as Wing Commander of RAF Provost Branch, and died in June 1970 in Ramsgate Hospital in Kent .

== Awards ==
- Order of the British Empire (Officer) Military Division on 10 June 1948.
