= Neville McGarr =

South African fighter pilot

Clement Aldwyn Neville McGarr
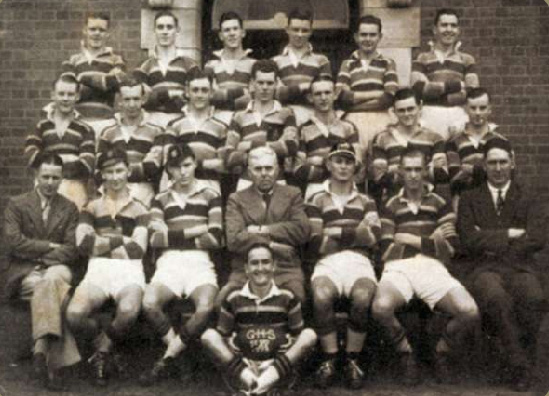
- Glenwood High 1st XV Rugby team, McGarr at top right
- Born: Clement Aldwyn Neville McGarr; 24 November 1917; Johannesburg, South Africa
- Died: 6 April 1944 (aged 26)
- Burial place: Poznan Old Garrison Cemetery, Poland
- Military career
- Allegiance: (South Africa)
- Branch: South African Air Force
- Service years: 1940–44
- Rank: Lieutenant
- Nickname: Nev
- Service number: 95691
- Unit: No. 2 Squadron SAAF
- Conflicts: World War II: Western Desert campaign (POW)
- Awards: Mentioned in Despatches

Neville McGarr (24 November 1917 – 6 April 1944), was a fighter pilot from South Africa who was taken prisoner during the Second World War. He participated in the 'Great Escape' from Stalag Luft III in March 1944 but was one of the men recaptured and subsequently murdered by the Gestapo.

== Pre-war life ==
McGarr was born in Johannesburg, South Africa and moved with his family to Durban, in 1923. He began his education there but suffered with polio and was paralyzed from the waist down at the age of twelve. McGarr did not give up and working constantly; he managed to recover the use of his legs and by September 1930 was able to start high school. He was educated at Glenwood High School from 1932 to 1935 and before matriculating he had earned a series of awards for sports and academic achievement and was a member of the first XV Rugby team for his school. He commenced work in the laboratories of Lever Brothers before moving to the Treasury Department of Durban Corporation. His hobbies involved his Rudge Special motorcycle and his BSA Scout sports car although he did complete a tour of duty with the naval reserve.

== Service career ==
After the Second World War broke out, McGarr and two friends enlisted in the South African Air Force to train as pilots in May 1940. On 23 May 1940 his service commenced and on 26 April 1941 he was commissioned as second lieutenant having been presented with his pilot's brevet. He was posted to Egypt on 21 July 1941 and in October 1941 joined No. 2 Squadron SAAF flying Curtiss P-40 Tomahawk fighters over the Libya-Egypt frontier.

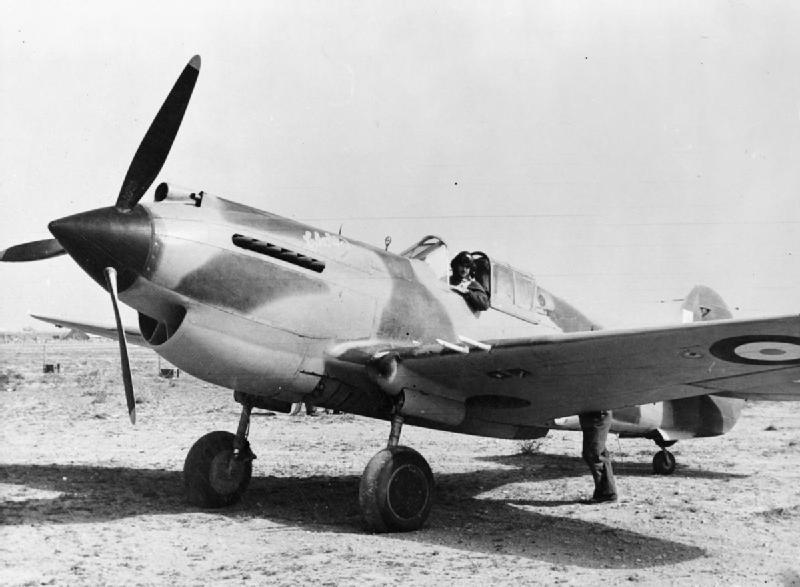
A Tomahawk fighter of the SAAF in the desert.

== Prisoner of war ==
On 6 October 1941 flying with his squadron on a patrol in the Sidi Omar vicinity they were intercepted by a formation of Luftwaffe Messerschmitt Bf 109 fighters of II Gruppe Jagdgeschwader 27 and two P-40 Tomahawks were shot down by Gustav Roedel and Otto Schulz. McGarr baled out, his wing mate was killed in action. He landed and set off on foot with only one shoe, the other having been lost. After three days walking through the desert without food or water he was captured by soldiers of the Afrika Korps and after only a few days in a prison camp in Libya was sent to Germany where he was held at Stalag Luft I Barth before being transferred to Stalag Luft III where he was an immediate volunteer for tunneling although his physical size made him unsuitable and he was asked to supervise the security teams maintaining a watch against German checks which might otherwise discover the tunnels.

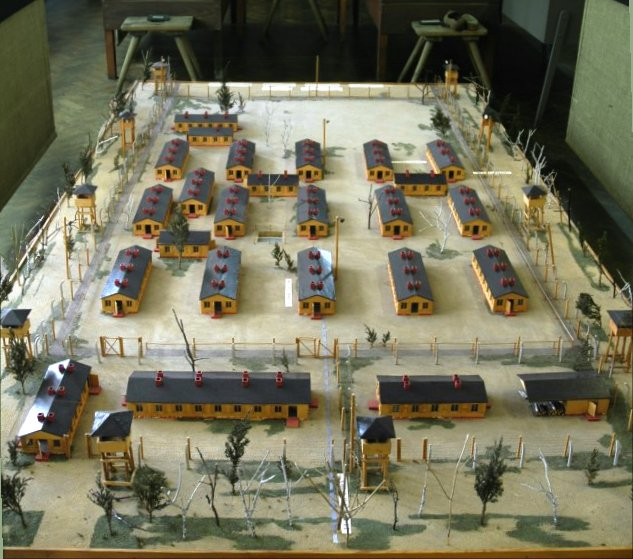
Model of Stalag Luft III prison camp.

== 'Great Escape' ==
McGarr was one of the 76 men who escaped the prison camp on the night of 24–25 March 1944, in the escape now famous as "the Great Escape". When the Germans discovered the escape they began extensive well planned manhunts.

Neville McGarr was briefly trapped in the tunnel due to his stature but was freed and escaped into the woods although on the afternoon of 27 March 1944 after surviving the freezing temperatures and blizzards he was recaptured with George McGill and taken to the civil prison at Zagan. He was one of 19 men now recaptured and held there until moved to Görlitz prison where he was in a cell with Keith Ogilvie, Paul Royle and Chaz Hall. Early on the morning of 6 April 1944 Tony Bethell heard a truck arrive at the prison and heard six names being called out, Denys Street, Neville McGarr, Jack Grisman, Sandy Gunn, Harold Milford and John F Williams were taken away.

He was one of the 50 escapers executed and murdered by the Gestapo. Originally cremated at Breslau by the Gestapo and buried at Sagan, he is now buried in part of the Poznan Old Garrison Cemetery.

McGarr is recorded on the official list published by the Royal Canadian Air Force His name was amongst the 47 murdered officers named in the British press when the story became public knowledge on or about 20 May 1944

Memorial to "The Fifty" down the road toward Żagań, McGarr is on the right hand panel

== Awards ==
His conspicuous bravery was recognized by a Mention in Despatches as none of the other relevant decorations then available could be awarded posthumously. It was published in a supplement to the London Gazette on 8 June 1944.

== Other victims ==
See Stalag Luft III murders

The Gestapo executed a group of 50 of the recaptured prisoners representing almost all of the nationalities involved in the escape.

Post-war investigations saw a number of those guilty of the murders tracked down, arrested and tried for their crimes.

Nationalities of the 50 executed
(United Kingdom) 21 British
(Canada) 6 Canadian
(Poland) 6 Polish
(Australia) 5 Australian
(South Africa) 3 South African
(New Zealand) 2 New Zealanders
(Norway) 2 Norwegian
(Belgium) 1 Belgian
(Czechoslovakia) 1 Czechoslovak
(France) 1 Frenchman
(Greece) 1 Greek
(Lithuania) 1 Lithuanian
