= Michael James Casey =

British airforce officer

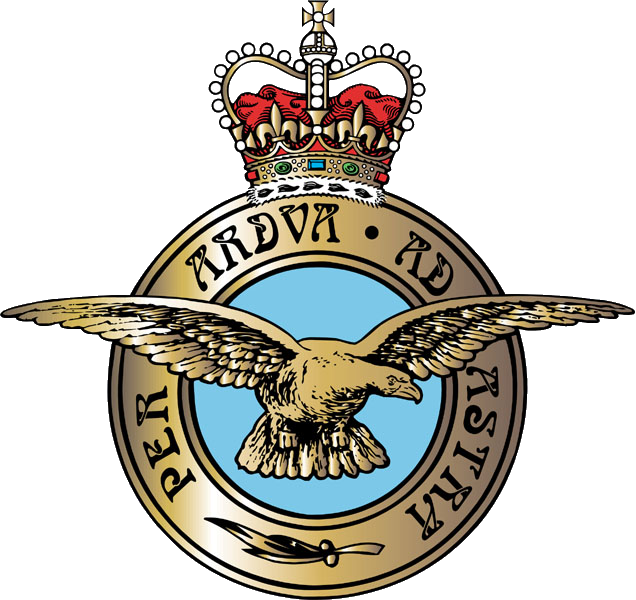
- Born: Michael James O'Brien Casey; 19 February 1918; Allahabad, Uttar Pradesh India
- Died: 31 March 1944 (aged 26) near Halbau
- Burial place: Poznan Old Garrison Cemetery, Poland
- Military career
- Allegiance: United Kingdom
- Branch: Royal Air Force
- Service years: 1936–1944
- Rank: Flight lieutenant
- Nickname: Mike
- Service number: 39024
- Unit: No. 57 Squadron RAF
- Conflicts: World War II: Channel Front (POW)
- Awards: Mentioned in despatches

Michael James Casey (19 February 1918 – 31 March 1944), was a British Blenheim bomber pilot of Irish descent who was taken prisoner during the Second World War. He took part in the 'Great Escape' from Stalag Luft III in March 1944, but was one of the men re-captured and subsequently shot by the Gestapo.

== Pre-war life ==
Casey was born in Allahabad, Uttar Pradesh, India, where his father was the inspector general of police for the entire province. Casey was educated in Ireland at Clongowes Wood College near Dublin, and later in England at Stonyhurst College boarding school. At both places, he excelled at boxing, rugby and cricket. On finishing school, he applied for a short service commission and joined the Royal Air Force as a flight cadet at the RAF College Cranwell passing out as an acting pilot officer on 1 August 1936. He was then posted to No. 57 Squadron RAF at Upper Heyford on 24 March 1937 to fly Hawker Hind bomber aircraft. Casey was confirmed in his rank on 29 June 1937. The squadron later converted to Bristol Blenheim light bombers in May 1938 and Casey was promoted to flying officer on 29 March 1939. On 19 September 1939 he married Marjorie, the sister of a friend.

== War service ==
Serving as a Blenheim bomber pilot still with 57 Squadron, Casey went to France with his unit in late September 1939 where his operational war service was brief as he was shot down very soon afterwards. He was promoted to flight lieutenant on 3 September 1940 while in captivity.

== Prisoner of war ==
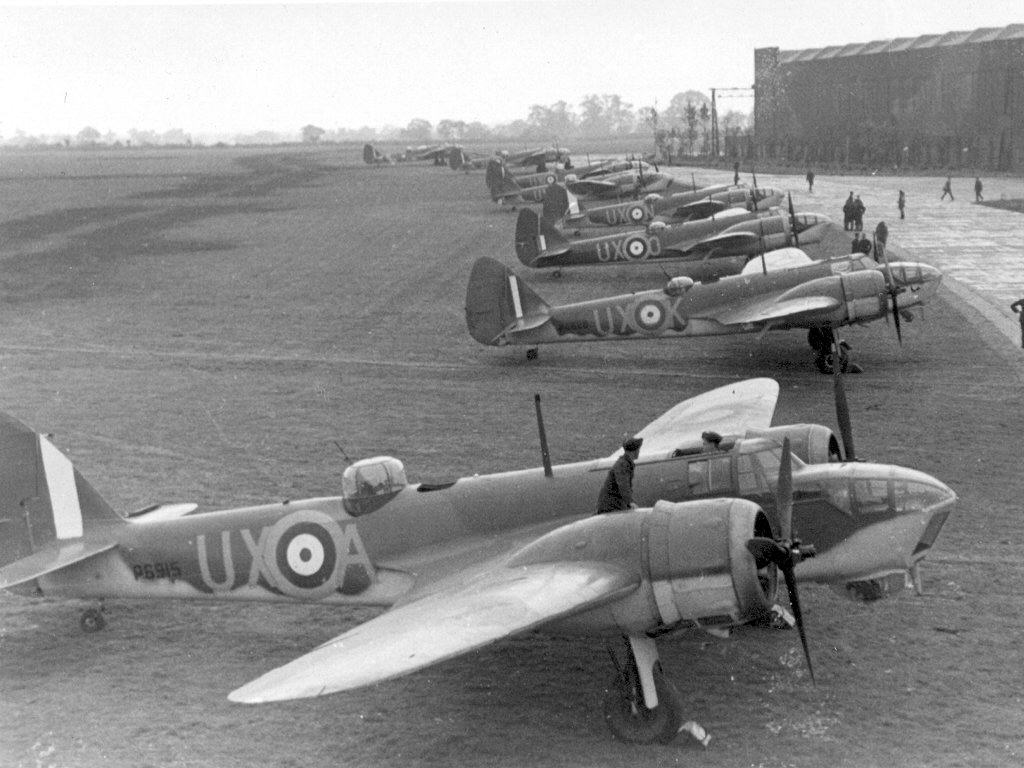
Bristol Blenheim light bombers

Tasked with a reconnaissance mission over the Wesel-Bocholt area of Germany, Casey took off from the airfield at Etain at 1100 hours on 16 October 1939 flying a Bristol Blenheim Mark I (serial L1141). His observer was Sergeant Alfie Fripp RAF and his wireless operator/air gunner Aircraftman 1st Class J. Nelson RAF. A Luftwaffe Messerschmitt Bf 109 flown by Leutnant Hans-Folkert Rosenboom of Jagdgeschwader 1 (Fighter Wing 1) intercepted the Blenheim and, after a long chase sometimes only 6 feet from the ground, shot it down near Lingen. All three airmen scrambled clear of the wreckage before it burst into flames. Issued with prisoner of war number 24, Casey was sent to Luftwaffe prison camp Stalag Luft I at Barth where he met Squadron Leader Roger Bushell. Bushell later masterminded the Great Escape. While held at Barth, Casey was one of a group of prisoners known as "ghosts" who hid from the Germans within the camp for extended periods and did not attend the roll calls to give the impression that they had escaped. This tied up German military and police resources to scour the region for escapers. Casey was a member of the group of "bad lads" with Bushell who were sent to the reputedly escape proof Stalag Luft III in the province of Lower Silesia near the town of Sagan (now Żagań in Poland).

== 'Great Escape' ==
For the Great Escape operation, Casey was the treasurer, head of filing and, most importantly, arranged safe concealment of forged documents in caches around the camp avoiding the repeated and intensive German searches. Casey was one of the 76 men who escaped the prison camp on the night of 24–25 March 1944 in the escape now famous as "the Great Escape". He cleared the tunnel and headed south with another escapee. Both were dressed in civilian clothes and posing as foreign war workers. When stopped near Görlitz by police, their papers did not stand up to scrutiny and they were arrested and held with other re-captured escapees in the town jail. On 31 March 1944, six re-captured prisoners (Casey, Ian Cross, Tom Leigh, George Wiley, the badly frostbitten Al Hake and John Pohe) were taken from Görlitz prison in black Gestapo sedans. According to Gestapo agent, Scharpwinkel, another agent named Lux then informed them that they had been sentenced to death by order of the Supreme Military Commander, Adolf Hitler. The prisoners were shot beside the autobahn near Halbau and their bodies cremated at Görlitz. Casey was one of the 50 escapers executed and murdered by the Gestapo. Originally, his remains were buried at Sagan, but he is now buried in part of the Poznan Old Garrison Cemetery.

Memorial to "The Fifty" down the road toward Żagań (Casey at left)

The Glasgow Herald of 19 May 1944 published an early list naming several officers, including Casey

== Awards ==
His conspicuous bravery as a prisoner was recognised by a mention in despatches as none of the other relevant decorations then available could be awarded posthumously. It was published in a supplement to the London Gazette on 8 June 1944.

== Other victims ==
See Stalag Luft III murders

The Gestapo executed a group of 50 of the re-captured prisoners representing almost all of the nationalities involved in the escape. Post-war investigations saw a number of those guilty of the murders tracked down, arrested and tried for their crimes.

Nationalities of the 50 executed
(United Kingdom) 21 British
(Canada) 6 Canadian
(Poland) 6 Polish
(Australia) 5 Australian
(South Africa) 3 South African
(New Zealand) 2 New Zealanders
(Norway) 2 Norwegian
(Belgium) 1 Belgian
(Czechoslovakia) 1 Czechoslovak
(France) 1 Frenchman
(Greece) 1 Greek
(Lithuania) 1 Lithuanian
