= Stalag Luft III murders =

War crimes perpetrated by members of the Nazi Gestapo

The Stalag Luft III murders were war crimes perpetrated by members of the Gestapo following the "Great Escape" of Allied prisoners of war from the German Air Force prison camp known as Stalag Luft III on March 25, 1944. Of the 76 successful escapees, 73 were recaptured, most within several days of the breakout, 50 of whom were executed on the personal orders of Adolf Hitler. These executions were conducted shortly after the prisoners' recapture.

Outrage at the killings was expressed immediately, both in the prison camp, among comrades of the escaped prisoners and in the United Kingdom, where Foreign Secretary Anthony Eden rose in the House of Commons to announce in June 1944 that those guilty of what the British government suspected was a war crime would be "brought to exemplary justice."

After Nazi Germany's capitulation in May 1945, the Police branch of the Royal Air Force, with whom the 50 airmen had been serving, launched an investigation into the killings, having branded the shootings a war crime despite official German reports that the airmen had been shot while attempting to escape from captivity following recapture. An extensive investigation headed by Wing Commander Wilfred Bowes (RAF) and Squadron Leader Frank McKenna of the Special Investigation Branch into the events following the recapture of the 73 airmen was launched, which was unique for being the only major war crime to be investigated by a single branch of any nation's military.

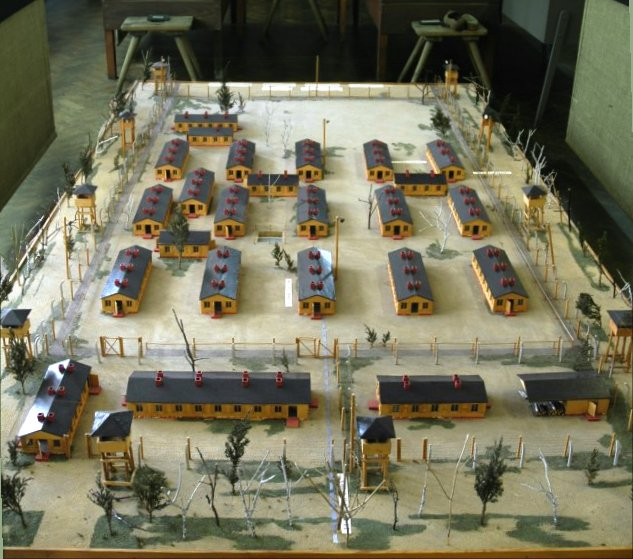
Model of Stalag Luft III prison camp

== Murders ==
Memorial to "The Fifty" down the road toward Żagań.

The day after the mass escape from Stalag Luft III, Hitler initially gave personal orders for every recaptured officer to be shot. Reichsmarschall Hermann Göring, head of the Luftwaffe, Reichsführer-SS Heinrich Himmler, chief of state security, and Field Marshal Wilhelm Keitel, head of the German High Command, who had ultimate control over prisoners of war, argued about the responsibility for the escape. Göring pointed out to Hitler that a massacre might bring about reprisals against German pilots in Allied hands. Hitler agreed, but insisted "more than half" were to be shot, eventually ordering Himmler to execute more than half of the escapees. Himmler fixed the total at 50. Keitel gave orders that the murdered officers were to be cremated and their ashes returned to the POW camp as a deterrent to further escapes. Himmler set up the logistics for actually killing the men, and passed it down through his subordinates in the Gestapo. The general orders were that recaptured officers would be turned over to the Criminal Police, and 50 would be handed to the Gestapo to be killed.

As the prisoners were recaptured, they were interrogated for any useful information and taken out by motor car, usually in small parties of two at a time, on the pretext of returning them to their prison camp. Their Gestapo escorts would stop them in the country and invite the officers to relieve themselves. The prisoners were then shot at close range from behind by pistol or machine pistol fire. The bodies were then left for retrieval, after which they were cremated and their ashes returned in urns to Stalag Luft III.

British Military Intelligence was made aware of the extraordinary events even during conditions of wartime by letters home and as a result of communications from the protecting power, Switzerland, which as a neutral party regularly reported on conditions in prisoner camps to both sides. Notices posted in camps for Allied POWs on 23 July 1944 that "THE ESCAPE FROM PRISON CAMPS IS NO LONGER A SPORT" in the wake of the Stalag Luft III escape, as well as the suspicious deaths of 50 officers during their recapture, led the British government to suspect a war crime had occurred.

The British government learned initially of 47 deaths after a routine visit to the camp by the Swiss authorities as the protecting power in May; UK Foreign Secretary Anthony Eden announced this news to the House of Commons on 19 May 1944. Shortly after the announcement the Senior British Officer of the camp, Group Captain Herbert Massey, was repatriated to England due to ill health. Upon his return, he informed the Government about the circumstances of the escape and the reality of the murder of the recaptured escapees. With the information received from Massey along with the official notification of the 50 deaths from the German Government, Eden updated Parliament on 23 June, promising that, at the end of the war, those responsible would be brought to exemplary justice.

== Investigation ==
A detachment of the Special Investigation Branch of the Royal Air Force Police, headed by Wing Commander Wilfred Bowes, was given the assignment of tracking down the killers of the 50 officers. The investigation started seventeen months after the alleged crimes had been committed, making it a cold case. Worse, according to an account of the investigation, the perpetrators "belonged to a body, the Secret State Police or Gestapo, which held and exercised every facility to provide its members with false identities and forged identification papers[;] immediately they were ordered to go on the run at the moment of national surrender."

The small detachment of investigators, numbering five officers and fourteen NCOs, remained active for three years, and identified 72 men as guilty of either murder or conspiracy to murder, of whom 69 were accounted for. Of these, 21 were eventually tried and executed (some of these for other than the Stalag Luft III murders); seventeen were tried and imprisoned; eleven had committed suicide; seven were untraced, although four of these were presumed dead; six had been killed during the war; five were arrested but not charged; one was arrested but not charged so he could be used as a material witness; three were charged but either acquitted or had the sentence quashed on review; and one remained in refuge in East Germany.

Despite attempts to cover up the murders during the war, the investigators were aided by such things as Germany's meticulous bookkeeping, such as at various crematoria, as well as willing eyewitness accounts and many confessions among the Gestapo members themselves, who cited that they were only following orders.

== Accused ==
=== High command ===
| Name | Position | Fate |
|---|---|---|
| Hitler, Adolf | Führer | Committed suicide on 30 April 1945 |
| Keitel, Wilhelm | Head of OKW "Supreme Command of the Armed Forces" | Executed at Nuremberg Prison on 16 October 1946 |
| Himmler, Heinrich | Reichsführer-SS and Chief of the German Police | Committed suicide on 23 May 1945 |
| Göring, Hermann | Luftwaffe and enemy Air Forces POWs | Committed suicide on 15 October 1946, hours before his scheduled execution at Nuremberg Prison |

=== RSHA leadership ===
| Name | Position | Fate |
|---|---|---|
| Kaltenbrunner, Ernst | Chief of RSHA | Executed at Nuremberg Prison on 16 October 1946 |
| Nebe, Arthur | Chief of Kripo, RSHA | Executed by Nazi Germany at Plötzensee Prison on 21 March 1945 (for his complicity in the 20 July plot) |
| Wielen, Max | Kripo, Breslau | Sentenced to life imprisonment on 3 September 1947; commuted to 21 years; released on 24 October 1952 |
| Müller, Heinrich | Chief of Gestapo, RSHA | Unknown – vanished after April 1945 |
| Scharpwinkel, Wilhelm | Gestapo, Breslau | Died in Soviet prison in October 1947 |

=== Gestapo field officers ===
| Name | Office | Fate |
|---|---|---|
| Absalon, Gunther | Breslau | Died in Soviet prison in May 1948 |
| Baatz | Reichenberg | Prematurely released from Red Army camp |
| Boschert, Heinrich | Karlsruhe | Sentenced to death on 3 September 1947, commuted to life imprisonment |
| Breithaupt, Walter | Saarbrücken | Sentenced to life imprisonment on 3 September 1947, released on October 24, 1952 |
| Bruchhardt, Reinhold | Danzig | Sentenced to death on 6 November 1948, commuted to life imprisonment upon Britain's abandonment of the death sentence experimentally, released 1956 |
| Dankert | Breslau | Untraced |
| Denkmann, Artur | Kiel | Sentenced to 10 years in prison on 3 September 1947 |
| Dissner, Max | Strasbourg | Committed suicide on 11 May 1948 |
| Ganninger, Otto | Karlsruhe | Committed suicide on 26 April 1946 |
| Geith, Eduard | München | Executed at Hamelin Prison on 27 February 1948 |
| Gmeiner, Josef | Karlsruhe | Executed at Hamelin Prison on 27 February 1948 |
| Hampel, Walter | Breslau | Arrested on 1 September 1948, charge not proceeded with in accordance with British government's new war crimes policy |
| Hänsel, Richard | Breslau | Acquitted on 6 November 1948 |
| Herberg, Walter | Karlsruhe | Executed at Hamelin Prison on 27 February 1948 |
| Hilker, Heinrich | Strasbourg | Prematurely released from French custody, charged but case dismissed 23 December 1966 |
| Hug, Julius | Danzig | Untraced |
| Isselhorst, Erich | Strasbourg | Executed at Strasbourg on 23 February 1948 for other atrocities |
| Jacobs, Walter | Kiel | Executed at Hamelin Prison on 27 February 1948 |
| Kähler, Hans | Kiel | Executed at Hamelin Prison on 27 February 1948 |
| Kilpe, Max | Danzig | Arrested 27 August 1948, charges not prosecuted |
| Kiske, Paul | Breslau | Killed during the Siege of Breslau in 1945 |
| Kiowsky, Friedrich | Brno/Zlín | Executed in Czechoslovakia 1947 |
| Knappe, ? | Breslau | Killed during the Siege of Breslau in 1945 |
| Knippelberg, Adolf | Brno/Zlín | Prematurely released from Red Army camp 1945 |
| Koslowsky, Otto | Brno/Zlín | Executed in Czechoslovakia on 3 May 1947 |
| Kreuzer, ? | Breslau | Untraced, likely killed in 1945 |
| Kuhnel, ? | Breslau | Killed during the Siege of Breslau in 1945 |
| Lang, ? | Breslau | Untraced, probably killed 1945 |
| Läuffer, ? | Breslau | Suicide reported, not confirmed |
| Lux, Walter | Breslau | Killed during the Siege of Breslau in 1945 |
| Nölle, Wilhelm | Brno/Zlín | Arrested 10 June 1948; charge not proceeded with |
| Pattke, Walter | Breslau | Untraced, probably killed 1945 |
| Post, Johannes | Kiel | Executed at Hamelin Prison on 27 February 1948 |
| Preiss, Otto | Karlsruhe | Executed at Hamelin Prison on 27 February 1948 |
| Prosse, ? | Breslau | Died 1944 |
| Romer, Hugo | Brno/Zlín | Untraced |
| Sasse, Walter | Danzig | Escaped from internment camp |
| Schäfer, Oswald | München | Acquitted on 11 December 1968 |
| Schauschütz, Franz | Brno/Zlín | Executed in Czechoslovakia in 1947 |
| Schermer, Martin | München | Committed suicide on 25 April 1945 |
| Schimmel, Alfred | Strasbourg | Executed at Hamelin Prison on 27 February 1948 |
| Schmauser, Ernst | Breslau | Captured by Red Army |
| Schmidt, Franz | Kiel | Committed suicide on 27 October 1946 |
| Schmidt, Friedrich (Fritz) | Kiel | Sentenced to two years imprisonment in May 1968 |
| Schmidt, Oskar | Kiel | Executed at Hamelin Prison on 27 February 1948 |
| Schneider, Johann | München | Executed at Hamelin Prison on 27 February 1948 |
| Schröder, Robert | Breslau | Not charged, used as material witness |
| Schulz, Emil | Saarbrücken | Executed at Hamelin Prison on 27 February 1948 |
| Schwartzer, Friedrich | Brno/Zlín | Executed in Czechoslovakia 1947 |
| Seetzen, Heinrich | Breslau | Committed suicide on 28 September 1945 |
| Spann, Leopold | Saarbrücken | Killed in air raid, Linz, 25 April 1945 |
| Struve, Wilhelm | Kiel | Sentenced to 10 years imprisonment on 3 September 1947 |
| Venediger, Günther | Danzig | Sentenced to two years imprisonment after four years of appeals, 17 December 1957 |
| Voelz, Walter | Danzig | Untraced, believed killed |
| Weil, Emil | München | Executed at Hamelin Prison on 27 February 1948 |
| Weissman, Robert | Reichenberg | Held by French authorities but not transferred |
| Wenzler, Herbert | Danzig | Arrested 1948, charge not proceeded with |
| Weyland, Robert | Reichenberg | Refuge in Soviet zone |
| Wieczorek, Erwin | Breslau | Sentenced to death 6 November 1948, conviction quashed on review |
| Wielen, Max | Breslau | Sentenced to life imprisonment 3 September 1947; commuted to 15 years; released on 24 October 1952 |
| Witt, Harry | Danzig | Arrested September 1948, charge not proceeded with |
| Wochner, Magnus | Karlsruhe | Sentenced to 10 years' imprisonment for atrocities at Natzweiler-Struthof |
| Zacharias, Erich | Brno/Zlín | Executed at Hamelin Prison on 27 February 1948 |
| Ziegler, Hans | Brno/Zlín | Committed suicide on 3 February 1948 |

== Trials ==
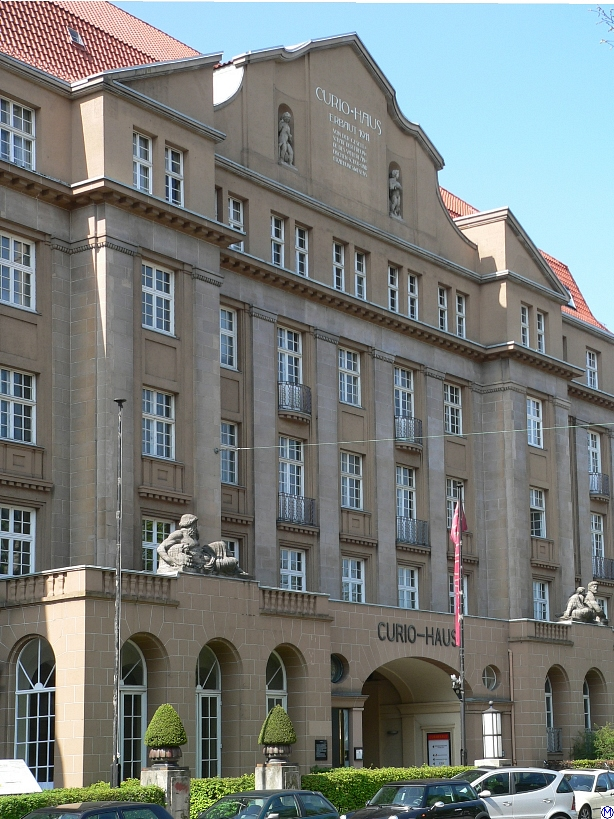
The Hamburg Curio Haus, photographed in more recent times

SS-Gruppenführer Arthur Nebe, who is believed to have selected the airmen to be shot, was later executed by the Nazis for his involvement in the 20 July plot to kill Hitler.

At the Nuremberg trials of the most senior Nazi war criminals, the indictment in the case called for the General Staff of the Army and the High Command of the German Armed Forces to be considered criminal organizations; the witnesses were several of the surviving German Field Marshals and their staff officers. One of the crimes charged was the murder of the 50. Luftwaffe Colonel Bernd von Brauchitsch, who served on the staff of Reich Marshal Hermann Göring, was interrogated by Captain Horace Hahn about the murders. David Maxwell Fyfe, Britain's chief prosecutor at the trials, was able to prove that Reichsmarschall Göring and General Staff chief Wilhelm Keitel had been present at a conference two days after the escape where the decision to order the murders was taken. Both men were sentenced to death for this, and for numerous other war crimes.

The first trial specifically dealing with the Stalag Luft III murders began on 1 July 1947, against 18 defendants. The trial was held before No. 1 War Crimes Court at the Curio Haus in Hamburg. The accused all pleaded Not Guilty to the counts indicated on the table below; names in the final column are the victims that they were accused of murdering. The verdicts and sentences were handed down after a full fifty days on 3 September of that year. Max Wielen was found guilty of conspiracy and sentenced to life imprisonment. The others were found not guilty of the first two charges, but guilty of the individual charges of murder. Breithaupt received life imprisonment, Denkmann and Struve ten years' imprisonment each, and Boschert eventually received life imprisonment. The other 13 condemned prisoners were hanged at Hamelin Prison in February 1948 by British executioner Albert Pierrepoint.

| Accused | _{Charge 1: Committing a war crime in that you at divers places in Germany and German-occupied territory between 25 March 1944 and 13 April 1944 were concerned together and with SS Gruppenführer Müller and SS Gruppenführer Nebe and other persons known and unknown in the killing in violations of the laws and usages of war of prisoners of war who had escaped from Stalag Luft III.} | _{Charge 2: Committing a war crime in that you in divers places in Germany and German-occupied territory between 25 March 1944 and 13 April 1944 aided and abetted SS Gruppenführer Müller and SS Gruppenführer Nebe and each other and other persons known and unknown in carrying out orders which were contrary to the laws and usages of war—namely, orders to kill prisoners of war who had escaped from Stalag Luft III.} | _{Charge 3: Committing a war crime in that you between (place) and (place) on or about (date) when members of the (place) Gestapo, in violation of the laws and usages of war were concerned in the killing of (victim(s)), both of the (force), prisoners of war.} |
|---|---|---|---|
| Boschert, Heinrich | x | x | D. H. Cochran |
| Breithaupt, Walter | x | x | R. J. Bushell and B. M. W. Scheidhauer |
| Denkmann, Artur | x | x | J. Catanach, H. Espelid, A. G. Christensen, N. Fuglesang |
| Geith, Eduard | x | x | J. R. Stevens, J. S. Gouws |
| Gmeiner, Josef | x | x | D. H. Cochran |
| Herberg, Walter | x | x | D. H. Cochran |
| Jacobs, Walter | x | x | H. Espelid, A. G. Christensen, N. Fuglesang |
| Kähler, Hans | x | x | J. Catanach, H. Espelid, A. G. Christensen, N. Fuglesang |
| Post, Johannes | x | x | J. Catanach, H. Espelid, A. G. Christensen, N. Fuglesang |
| Preiss, Otto | x | x | D. H. Cochran |
| Schimmel, Alfred | x | x | A. R. H. Hayter |
| Schmidt, Oskar | x | x | H. Espelid, A.G. Christensen, N. Fuglesang |
| Schneider, Johann | x | x | J. R. Stevens, J. S. Gouws |
| Schulz, Emil | x | x | R. J. Bushell, B. M. W. Scheidhauer |
| Struve, Wilhelm | x | x | H. Espelid, A. G. Christensen, N. Fuglesang |
| Weil, Emil | x | x | J. R. Stevens, J. S. Gouws |
| Wielen, Max | x | x | N/A |
| Zacharias, Erich | x | x | G. A. Kidder, T. G. Kirby-Green |

A second trial began in Hamburg on 11 October 1948, with verdicts and sentences being reached by November 6. In the interim, however, Ernest Bevin, the British Foreign Secretary, announced a Cabinet decision not to prosecute any more war criminals after 31 August 1948.

Accused
Bruchhardt, Reinhold
Hänsel, Richard
Wieczorek, Erwin

== In popular culture ==
The murders were shown (as a single massacre rather than individuals or small groups being murdered) in the 1963 film The Great Escape. The film also depicts some of the escapees engaging in acts of war while in civilian clothing, which would have weakened the war-crimes charges, had such violence taken place. (For example, Lieutenant-Commander Eric Ashley-Pitt, played by David McCallum, shoots a German in an effort to avoid arrest of two fellow escapees.)

The search for the culprits responsible for the murder of the 50 Allied officers was depicted in The Great Escape II: The Untold Story.

A dramatisation of the investigation, written by Robin Brooks and Robert Radcliffe, was featured in the BBC Radio 4 "Saturday Drama" series, first broadcast on 13 April 2013.
