= List of Allied airmen from the Great Escape =

The "Great Escape" was a World War II mass escape from the German prisoner-of-war camp Stalag Luft III. It resulted in the murder of 50 recaptured escapees.

It was the basis of The Great Escape, a book by Paul Brickhill describing the escape and The Great Escape, a film based on the book.

Memorial to "The Fifty" Allied airmen murdered after the "Great Escape"

== Murdered ==
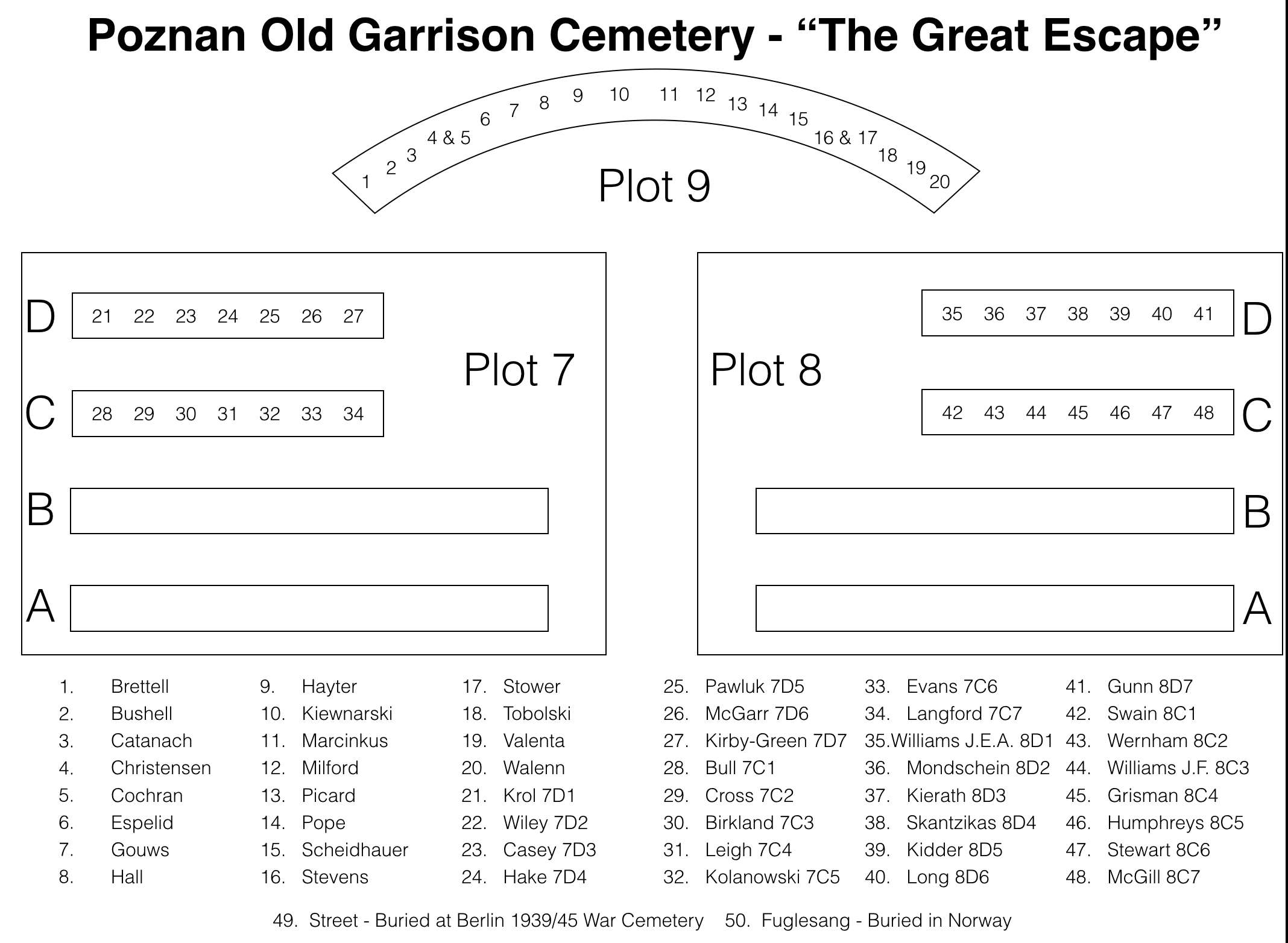
The graves of 48 of the 50 officers of the Great Escape at Poznan Old Garrison Cemetery

Name	Rank	Nation	Unit	Date of death/ Last seen alive	Cremated
Birkland, Henry J.	Flying Officer	(Canada) CAN	No. 72 Sqn RAF	30 March 1944 (Note: Flying Officers Włodzimierz Kolanowski, Robert Stewart and Henry Birkland and Flight Lieutenants Ernst Valenta, Edgar Humphreys, George McGill, Cyril Swain, Charles Hall, Patrick Langford and Brian Evans. The men had been taken to Breslau for interrogation, and at about 7 p.m. one evening, they were placed in a lorry and taken on the road to Sagan, with a car driven by Schröder in the lead. The night was freezing, and about halfway to Sagan, the vehicles stopped. Walters)	Liegnitz (Legnica)
Brettell, E. Gordon	Flight Lieutenant	(United Kingdom) GBR	No. 133 Sqn RAF	29 March 1944	Danzig (Gdańsk)
Bull, Leslie G. "Johnny"	Flight Lieutenant	(United Kingdom) GBR	No. 109 Sqn RAF	29 March 1944	Brüx (Most)
Bushell, Roger J.	Squadron Leader	(United Kingdom) GBR (Note: Born in South Africa)	No. 92 Sqn RAF	29 March 1944	Saarbrücken
Casey, Michael J.	Flight Lieutenant	(United Kingdom) GBR	No. 57 Sqn RAF	31 March 1944	Görlitz
Catanach, James	Squadron Leader	(Australia) AUS	No. 455 Sqn RAAF	29 March 1944	Kiel
Christensen, Arnold G.	Pilot Officer	(New Zealand) NZL	No. 26 Sqn RAF	29 March 1944	Kiel
Cochran, Dennis H.	Flying Officer	(United Kingdom) GBR	No. 10 OTU RAF	31 March 1944	Natzweiler (Natzwiller)
Cross, Ian E. K. P.	Squadron Leader	(United Kingdom) GBR	No. 103 Sqn RAF	31 March 1944	Görlitz
Espelid, Halldor	Lieutenant	(Norway) NOR	No. 331 Sqn (Norwegian) RAF	29 March 1944	Kiel
Evans, Brian H.	Flight Lieutenant	(United Kingdom) GBR	No. 49 Sqn RAF	31 March 1944	Liegnitz
Fuglesang, Nils Jørgen	Lieutenant	(Norway) NOR	No. 332 Sqn (Norwegian) RAF	29 March 1944	Kiel
Gouws, Johannes S.	Lieutenant	(South Africa) ZAF	No. 40 Sqn SAAF	29 March 1944	Munich
Grisman, William J.	Flight Lieutenant	(United Kingdom) GBR	No. 109 Sqn RAF	6 April 1944	Breslau (Wrocław)
Gunn, Alastair D. M.	Flight Lieutenant	(United Kingdom) GBR	No. 1 PRU RAF	6 April 1944	Breslau
Hake, Albert H.	Flight Lieutenant	(Australia) AUS	No. 72 Sqn RAF	31 March 1944	Görlitz
Hall, Charles P.	Flight Lieutenant	(United Kingdom) GBR	No. 1 PRU RAF	31 March 1944	Liegnitz
Hayter, Anthony R. H.	Flight Lieutenant	(United Kingdom) GBR	No. 148 Sqn RAF	6 April 1944	Natzweiler
Humphreys, Edgar S.	Flight Lieutenant	(United Kingdom) GBR	No. 107 Sqn RAF	31 March 1944	Liegnitz
Kidder, Gordon A.	Flying Officer	(Canada) CAN	No. 156 Sqn RAF	29 March 1944	Mährisch Ostrau (Moravská Ostrava)
Kierath, Reginald V.	Flight Lieutenant	(Australia) AUS	No. 450 Sqn RAAF	29 March 1944	Brüx
Kiewnarski, Antoni	Flight Lieutenant	(Poland) POL	No. 305 Sqn (Polish) RAF	31 March 1944	unknown
Kirby-Green, Thomas G.	Squadron Leader	(United Kingdom) GBR	No. 40 Sqn RAF	29 March 1944	Mährisch Ostrau
Kolanowski, Włodzimierz A.	Flying Officer	(Poland) POL	No. 301 Sqn (Polish) RAF	31 March 1944	Liegnitz
Król, Stanisław Z.	Flying Officer	(Poland) POL	No. 64 Sqn RAF	12 April 1944	Breslau
Langford, Patrick W.	Flight Lieutenant	(Canada) CAN	No. 16 OTU RAF	31 March 1944	Liegnitz
Leigh, Tom	Flight Lieutenant	(Australia) AUS	No. 76 Sqn RAF	31 March 1944	Görlitz
Long, James L. R.	Flight Lieutenant	(United Kingdom) GBR	No. 9 Sqn RAF	12 April 1944	Breslau
Marcinkus, Romas	Flight Lieutenant	(Lithuania) LTU	No. 1 Sqn RAF	29 March 1944	Danzig
McGarr, Clement A. N.	Lieutenant	(South Africa) ZAF	No. 2 Sqn SAAF	6 April 1944	Breslau
McGill, George E.	Flight Lieutenant	(Canada) CAN	No. 103 Sqn RAF	31 March 1944	Liegnitz
Milford, Harold J.	Flight Lieutenant	(United Kingdom) GBR	No. 226 Sqn RAF	6 April 1944	Breslau
Mondschein, Jerzy T.	Flying Officer	(Poland) POL	No. 304 Sqn (Polish) RAF	29 March 1944	Brüx
Pawluk, Kazimierz	Flying Officer	(Poland) POL	No. 305 Sqn (Polish) RAF	31 March 1944	unknown
Picard, Henri A.	Flight Lieutenant	(Belgium) BEL	No. 350 Sqn (Belgian) RAF	29 March 1944	Danzig
Pohe, John	Flying Officer	(New Zealand) NZL	No. 51 Sqn RAF	31 March 1944	Görlitz
Scheidhauer, Bernard W. M.	Lieutenant	(France) FRA	No. 131 Sqn RAF	29 March 1944	Saarbrücken
Skanzikas, Sotiris	Pilot Officer	(Greece) GRC	No. 336 Sqn (Greek) RAF	30 March 1944	unknown
Stevens, Rupert J.	Lieutenant	(South Africa) ZAF	No. 12 Sqn SAAF	29 March 1944	Munich
Stewart, Robert C.	Flying Officer	(United Kingdom) GBR	No. 77 Sqn RAF	31 March 1944	Liegnitz
Stower, John Gifford	Flying Officer	(Argentina) ARG	No. 142 Sqn RAF	31 March 1944	Liegnitz
Street, Denys O.	Flying Officer	(United Kingdom) GBR	No. 207 Sqn RAF	6 April 1944	Breslau
Swain, Cyril D.	Flight Lieutenant	(United Kingdom) GBR	No. 105 Sqn RAF	31 March 1944	Liegnitz
Tobolski, Paweł	Flying Officer	(Poland) POL	No. 301 Sqn (Polish) RAF	2 April 1944	Breslau
Valenta, Arnošt	Flight Lieutenant	(Czechoslovakia) CZE	No. 311 Sqn (Czechoslovak) RAF	31 March 1944	Liegnitz
Walenn, Gilbert W.	Flight Lieutenant	(United Kingdom) GBR	No. 25 OTU RAF	29 March 1944	Danzig
Wernham, James C.	Flight Lieutenant	(Canada) CAN	No. 405 Sqn RCAF	30 March 1944	unknown
Wiley, George W.	Flight Lieutenant	(Canada) CAN	No. 112 Sqn RAF	31 March 1944	Görlitz
Williams, John E. A.	Squadron Leader	(Australia) AUS	No. 450 Sqn RAAF	29 March 1944	Brüx
Williams, John F.	Flight Lieutenant	(United Kingdom) GBR	No. 107 Sqn RAF	6 April 1944	Breslau

== Survivors ==
In boldface, the three escapees who managed to reach freedom.

Name	Rank	Nation	Unit
Armstrong, Albert	Flight Lieutenant	(United Kingdom) GBR	RAFVR (General Duties Branch)
**Bergsland, Per**	Sergeant	(Norway) NOR	No. 332 Squadron RAF
Bethell, Richard A.	Flight Lieutenant	(United Kingdom) GBR	No. 268 Squadron RAF
Broderick, Leslie C.J.	Flight Lieutenant	(United Kingdom) GBR	No. 106 Squadron RAF
Cameron, William J.	Flight Lieutenant	(Canada) CAN	No. 72 Squadron RAF
Churchill, Richard S.A.	Flight Lieutenant	(United Kingdom) GBR	No. 144 Squadron RAF
Day, Harry M.A.	Wing Commander	(United Kingdom) GBR	No. 57 Squadron RAF
Dodge, John B.	Major	(United Kingdom) GBR	The Middlesex Regiment (Duke of Cambridge's Own)
Dowse, Sydney H,	Flight Lieutenant	(United Kingdom) GBR	No. 1 Photographic Reconnaissance Unit RAF
Dvořák, Bedřich	Flight Lieutenant	(Czechoslovakia) CZE	No. 312 (Czechoslovak) Squadron RAF
Green, Bernard	Flight Lieutenant	(United Kingdom) GBR	No. 44 Squadron RAF
James, Bertram A.	Pilot Officer	(United Kingdom) GBR	No. 9 Squadron RAF
Langlois, Roy B.	Flight Lieutenant	(United Kingdom) GBR	No. 12 Squadron RAF
Marshall, Henry C.	Flight Lieutenant	(United Kingdom) GBR	No. 3 Photographic Reconnaissance Unit RAF
McDonald, Alistair T.	Flight Lieutenant	(United Kingdom) GBR	No. 1 Photographic Reconnaissance Unit RAF
**Müller, Jens E.**	Second Lieutenant	(Norway) NOR	No. 331 Squadron RAF
Neely, Alexander D.	Lieutenant	(United Kingdom) GBR	No. 825 Squadron Fleet Air Arm
Nelson, Thomas R.	Flight Lieutenant	(United Kingdom) GBR	No. 37 Squadron RAF
Ogilvie, Alfred K.	Flight Lieutenant	(Canada) CAN	No. 609 Squadron RAF
Plunkett, Desmond L.	Flight Lieutenant	(Southern Rhodesia) RSR	No. 218 Squadron RAF
Poynter, Douglas A.	Lieutenant	(United Kingdom) GBR	No. 825 Squadron Fleet Air Arm
Royle, Paul G.	Pilot Officer	(Australia) AUS	No. 53 Squadron RAF
Shand, Michael M.	Flight Lieutenant	(New Zealand) NZL	No. 485 Squadron RNZAF
Thompson, Alfred B.	Flight Lieutenant	(Canada) CAN	No. 102 Squadron RAF
Tonder, Ivo	Flight Lieutenant	(Czechoslovakia) CZE	No. 312 (Czechoslovak) Squadron RAF
Trent, Leonard H.	Squadron Leader	(New Zealand) NZL	No. 487 Squadron RNZAF
**van der Stok, Bram**	Flight Lieutenant	(Netherlands) NED	No. 41 Squadron RAF
van Wymeersch, Raymond	Flight Lieutenant	(France) FRA	No. 174 Squadron RAF
