= The Great Escape (film) =

1963 American epic historical war film

- Theatrical release poster by Frank McCarthy
- Directed by: John Sturges
- Screenplay by: James Clavell; W. R. Burnett
- Based on: The Great Escape; 1950 book by Paul Brickhill
- Produced by: John Sturges
- Starring: Steve McQueen; James Garner; Richard Attenborough; James Donald; Charles Bronson; Donald Pleasence; James Coburn
- Cinematography: Daniel L. Fapp
- Edited by: Ferris Webster
- Music by: Elmer Bernstein
- Production company: The Mirisch Company
- Distributed by: United Artists
- Release dates: June 20, 1963 (London); July 4, 1963 (United States)
- Running time: 172 minutes
- Country: United States
- Languages: English; German; French; Russian
- Budget: $3.8 million
- Box office: $11.7 million

The Great Escape is a 1963 American epic historical war adventure film starring Steve McQueen, James Garner and Richard Attenborough and featuring James Donald, Charles Bronson, Donald Pleasence, James Coburn, Hannes Messemer, David McCallum, Gordon Jackson, John Leyton and Angus Lennie. It was filmed in Panavision, and its musical score was composed by Elmer Bernstein. Adapted from Paul Brickhill's 1950 non-fiction book of the same name, the film depicts a heavily fictionalized version of the mass escape by British Commonwealth prisoners of war from German POW camp Stalag Luft III in World War II. The film made numerous compromises for its commercial appeal, including its portrayal of American involvement in the escape.

The Great Escape was made by The Mirisch Company, released by United Artists, and produced and directed by John Sturges. The film had its Royal World Premiere at the Odeon Leicester Square in London's West End on 20 June 1963. The Great Escape received critical acclaim and emerged as one of the highest-grossing films of the year, winning McQueen the award for Best Actor at the Moscow International Film Festival, and in later years has gained a cult following. The film is also noted for its motorcycle chase and jump scene, which is considered one of the best stunts ever performed.

== Plot ==
During World War II, Allied POWs who have repeatedly escaped from camps in Germany are moved to a new camp under the command of Luftwaffe Colonel von Luger. Several POWs unsuccessfully attempt to escape on the first day. Hilts, a notoriously prolific American escapee, finds a blind spot in the fence and gives himself up to the guards without revealing his discovery. He is placed in a cell next to Ives in "the cooler", and the two become friends.

Squadron Leader Roger Bartlett is warned that if he escapes and is caught, he will be shot. Nevertheless, he re-establishes the escape-planning committee from their former camp, and proposes breaking out 250 men to divert Germans away from the front. The POWs work on three tunnels: "Tom", "Dick", and "Harry".

Preparations are widespread and elaborate. Welinski and Dickes lead the digging, Sedgwick makes equipment such as picks and air bellows, Ashley-Pitt conceals the excavated dirt in plain sight, while Cavendish surveys the tunnels’ routes and leads a choir to mask the sounds of any escape-related activities. MacDonald gathers intelligence, Griffith sews civilian disguises, Blythe forges documents, and Hendley secures supplies on the black market. Aware that Hilts is planning his own escape, Bartlett asks him to allow himself to be recaptured so he can draw maps of the surrounding area but Hilts refuses.

When "Tom" nears completion, Bartlett orders "Dick" and "Harry" sealed off. Meanwhile, Hilts, Hendley, and Goff brew potato moonshine and celebrate the Fourth of July with the camp. However, the guards find "Tom" during the celebration. Ives snaps, climbs the fence, and is shot dead. Hilts, shaken, agrees to Bartlett's proposal, and Bartlett orders "Harry" reopened.

Welinski's claustrophobia is triggered after a tunnel collapse, but Dickes offers to guide him. Bartlett objects to Blythe's participation on discovering his progressive myopia, but Hendley offers to guide him. On the night of the escape, "Harry" is dug to the surface, but the exit has come up 20 feet (6.1 m) short of the woods, increasing the danger of detection. Hilts then uses 30 feet of rope to signal the prisoners when it's safe to exit the tunnel. The escape is also briefly aided by a fortuitous air raid blackout, which allows more to escape. Dozens flee before Cavendish unintentionally draws suspicion by slipping, and an impatient Griffith rushes, alerting the guards.

In all, 76 escapees make it through the tunnel. Welinski and Dickes steal a boat and board a ship for Sweden, while Sedgwick heads to France, where the Resistance smuggles him to Spain. The rest are captured: Cavendish is betrayed by a truck driver; Hendley and Blythe crash a stolen plane short of Switzerland when the engine fails; Blythe is shot, and Hendley is recaptured. Hilts rides a stolen motorcycle for the Swiss border with soldiers in pursuit who capture him when he fails to jump the cycle over the frontier fence. Ashley-Pitt sacrifices himself when he kills a Gestapo officer before he can expose Bartlett; however, Bartlett and MacDonald are still arrested after another Gestapo officer tricks MacDonald into speaking English while boarding a bus.

Ultimately, a total of 50 escapees, including Bartlett, MacDonald, and Cavendish, are executed. Ramsey informs Hendley and other returning survivors of the murders, and says that Bartlett's plan to create havoc was a success. Hendley questions whether it was worth the price. Von Luger, ashamed of the murders, is relieved of command. Hilts is returned to the cooler and resumes his solo game of catch.

== Cast ==
- Steve McQueen as Captain Virgil Hilts ('The Cooler King'): one of three Americans in the camp, a particularly persistent escapee with an irreverent attitude.
- James Garner as Flight Lieutenant Bob Hendley ('The Scrounger'): American RAF officer, Eagle Squadron, responsible for finding materials on the black market for the escape attempt; forms a close friendship with Blythe.
- Richard Attenborough as Squadron Leader Roger Bartlett ('Big X'): RAF officer and ringleader of the escape committee.
- James Donald as Group Captain Ramsey ('The SBO'): most senior British & Allied officer in the camp, serves as an intermediary between the Germans and the POWs as their de facto leader.
- Charles Bronson as Flight Lieutenant Danny Welinski ('Tunnel King'): Polish RAF officer; despite having dug 17 escape tunnels in other camps, is severely claustrophobic.
- Donald Pleasence as Flight Lieutenant Colin Blythe ('The Forger'): mild-mannered English forger; forms close friendship with Hendley. His character was based on the artist Ley Kenyon.
- James Coburn as Flying Officer Sedgwick ('The Manufacturer'): an Australian officer who constructs tools for the escape. (Note: Bartlett calls Sedgwick "Bluey", an affectionate Australian slang term for a person with red hair; however, Sedgwick is often mistakenly referred to as "Louis" in some sources, including DVD subtitles.)
- Hannes Messemer as Oberst von Luger ('The Kommandant'): Commandant of the camp and a senior Luftwaffe officer.
- David McCallum as Lieutenant-Commander Eric Ashley-Pitt ('Dispersal'): a Fleet Air Arm officer; devises a way to get rid of the tunnel dirt.
- Gordon Jackson as Flight Lieutenant Andy MacDonald ('Intelligence'): Bartlett's second-in-command.
- John Leyton as Flight Lieutenant Willie Dickes ('Tunnel King'): Welinski's best friend and co-lead on tunnel design and construction.
- Angus Lennie as Flying Officer Archie Ives ('The Mole'): anxious Scottish airman who befriends Hilts in the cooler.
- Nigel Stock as Flight Lieutenant Dennis Cavendish ('The Surveyor'): surveys the tunnel routes and leads prisoner choirs to cover up the sounds of digging and manufacturing.
- Robert Graf as Werner ('The Ferret'): young, naive guard whom Hendley befriends and exploits for black market contraband.
- Jud Taylor as Second Lieutenant Goff: the camp's third American.
- Hans Reiser as Kuhn: Gestapo officer and ardent Nazi.
- Harry Riebauer as Stabsfeldwebel Strachwitz: the senior NCO amongst the German guards.
- William Russell as Flight Lieutenant Sorren ('Security'): British officer who leads the escapers' lookouts and watchmen.
- Robert Freitag as Hauptmann Posen: von Luger's adjutant.
- Ulrich Beiger as Preissen: Gestapo officer.
- George Mikell as SD Hauptsturmführer Dietrich: SS officer.
- Lawrence Montaigne as Flying Officer Haynes ('Diversions'): Canadian officer in charge of distractions to draw the guards' attention away from any escape-related activity.
- Robert Desmond as Pilot Officer Griffith ('Tailor'): British officer; provides civilian clothes and military uniforms to disguise the escapees.
- Til Kiwe as Frick
- Heinz Weiss as Kramer
- Tom Adams as Flight Lieutenant Dai Nimmo ('Diversions'): Welsh officer in charge of distractions to draw the guards' attention away from any escape-related activity.
- Karl-Otto Alberty as SD Untersturmführer Steinach: SS officer.

== Production ==
=== Writing ===
In 1962, the Mirisch brothers worked with United Artists to adapt Paul Brickhill's 1950 book The Great Escape. Brickhill had been a very minor member of the X Organisation at Stalag Luft III, who acted as one of the "stooges" who monitored German movements in the camp. The story had been adapted as a live TV production, screened by NBC as an episode of The Philco Television Playhouse on January 27, 1951. The live broadcast was praised for engineering an ingenious set design for the live broadcast, including creating the illusion of tunnels. The film's screenplay was adapted by James Clavell, W. R. Burnett and Walter Newman.

Burnett said he worked on the script for a year and it was he who invented the American characters played by Steve McQueen and James Garner. He said Clavell worked on the script during this shoot.

=== Casting ===
Steve McQueen (left) with Wally Floody, a former Canadian POW who was part of the real Great Escape and acted as a technical advisor in production of the film

Steve McQueen, Charles Bronson and James Coburn had previously worked with director John Sturges on his 1960 motion picture, The Magnificent Seven. Steve McQueen has been credited with the most significant performance. Critic Leonard Maltin wrote that "the large, international cast is superb, but the standout is McQueen; it's easy to see why this cemented his status as a superstar". This film established his box-office clout. Hilts was based on at least three pilots, David M. Jones, John Dortch Lewis and Bill Ash.

Richard Attenborough's Sqn Ldr Roger Bartlett RAF, "Big X", was based on Roger Bushell, the South African-born British POW who was the mastermind of the real Great Escape. This was the film that first brought Attenborough to common notice in the United States. During World War II, Attenborough served in the Royal Air Force. He volunteered to fly with the Film Unit, and after further training (where he sustained permanent ear damage), he qualified as a sergeant. He flew on several missions over Europe, filming from the rear gunner's position to record the outcome of Bomber Command sorties. Richard Harris had originally been announced for the role.

James Donald played Group Captain Ramsey RAF, "the SBO" (Senior British Officer) in the camp. The role was based on Group Captain Herbert Massey, a World War I veteran who had volunteered in World War II. Massey walked with a limp, and in the movie Ramsey walks with a cane. Massey had suffered severe wounds to the same leg in both wars. There would be no escape for him, but as SBO he had to know what was going on. Group Captain Massey was a veteran escaper himself and had been in trouble with the Gestapo. His experience allowed him to offer sound advice to the X-Organisation. Another officer who is likely to have inspired the character of Ramsey was Wing Commander Harry Day.

Flt Lt Colin Blythe RAF, "The Forger", was based on Tim Walenn and played by Donald Pleasence. Pleasence had served in the Royal Air Force during World War II. He was shot down and spent a year in German prisoner-of-war camp Stalag Luft I. Charles Bronson had been a gunner in the USAAF and had been wounded, but never shot down. Like his character, Danny Welinski, he suffered from claustrophobia because of his childhood work in a mine. James Garner had been a soldier in the Korean War and was twice wounded. He was a scrounger during that time, as is his character.

Hannes Messemer's Commandant, "Colonel von Luger", was based on Oberst Friedrich Wilhelm von Lindeiner-Wildau. Messemer had been a POW in Russia during World War II and had escaped by walking hundreds of miles to the German border. He was wounded by Russian fire, but was not captured by the Russians. He surrendered to British forces and then spent two years in a POW facility in London known as the London Cage.

Angus Lennie's Flying Officer Archibald Ives, "The Mole", was based on Jimmy Kiddel, who was shot dead while trying to scale the fence.

The film is accurate in showing only three escapees made home runs, although the people who made them differed from those in the film. The escape of Danny and Willie to Sweden is based on two Norwegians, Per Bergsland and Jens Müller, while the escape of Royal Australian Air Force (RAAF) Flying Officer Sedgwick, "the Manufacturer", to Spain, was based on Dutchman Bram van der Stok. James Coburn, an American, was cast in the role of Sedgwick who was an amalgamation of Flt Lt Albert Hake, an Australian serving in the RAF, the camp's compass maker, and Johnny Travis, the real manufacturer. Filmink wrote that "if he didn’t crack the accent, Coburn nails the attitude" of an Australian.

Tilman 'Til Kiwe' Kiver played the German guard "Frick", who discovers the escape. Kiwe had been a German paratrooper officer who was captured and held prisoner at a POW camp in Colorado. He made several escape attempts, dyeing his uniform and carrying forged papers. He was captured in the St. Louis train station during one escape attempt. He won the Knight's Cross before his capture and was the cast member who had actually performed many of the exploits shown in the film.

=== Filming ===
The film was made on location in Germany at the Bavaria Film Studio in the Munich suburb of Geiselgasteig in rural Bavaria, where sets for the barrack interiors and tunnels were constructed. The camp was built in a clearing of the Perlacher Forst (Perlacher Forest) near the studio. The German town near the real camp was Sagan (now Żagań, Poland); it was renamed Neustadt in the film. Many scenes were filmed in and around the town of Füssen in Bavaria, including its railway station. The nearby district of Pfronten, with its distinctive St. Nikolaus Church and scenic background, also appears often in the film. The first scenes involving the railway were filmed on the Munich–Holzkirchen line at Großhesselohe station ("Neustadt" station in the movie) and near Deisenhofen. Hendley and Blythe's escape from the train was shot on the Munich–Mühldorf railway east of Markt Schwaben. The station where Bartlett, MacDonald and Ashley-Pitt arrive is Füssen station, whereas the scene of Sedgwick (whose theft of a bike was shot in Markt Schwaben) boarding a train was created in Pfronten-Ried station on the Ausserfern Railway. The castle Hendley and Blythe fly by while attempting to escape is Neuschwanstein Castle.

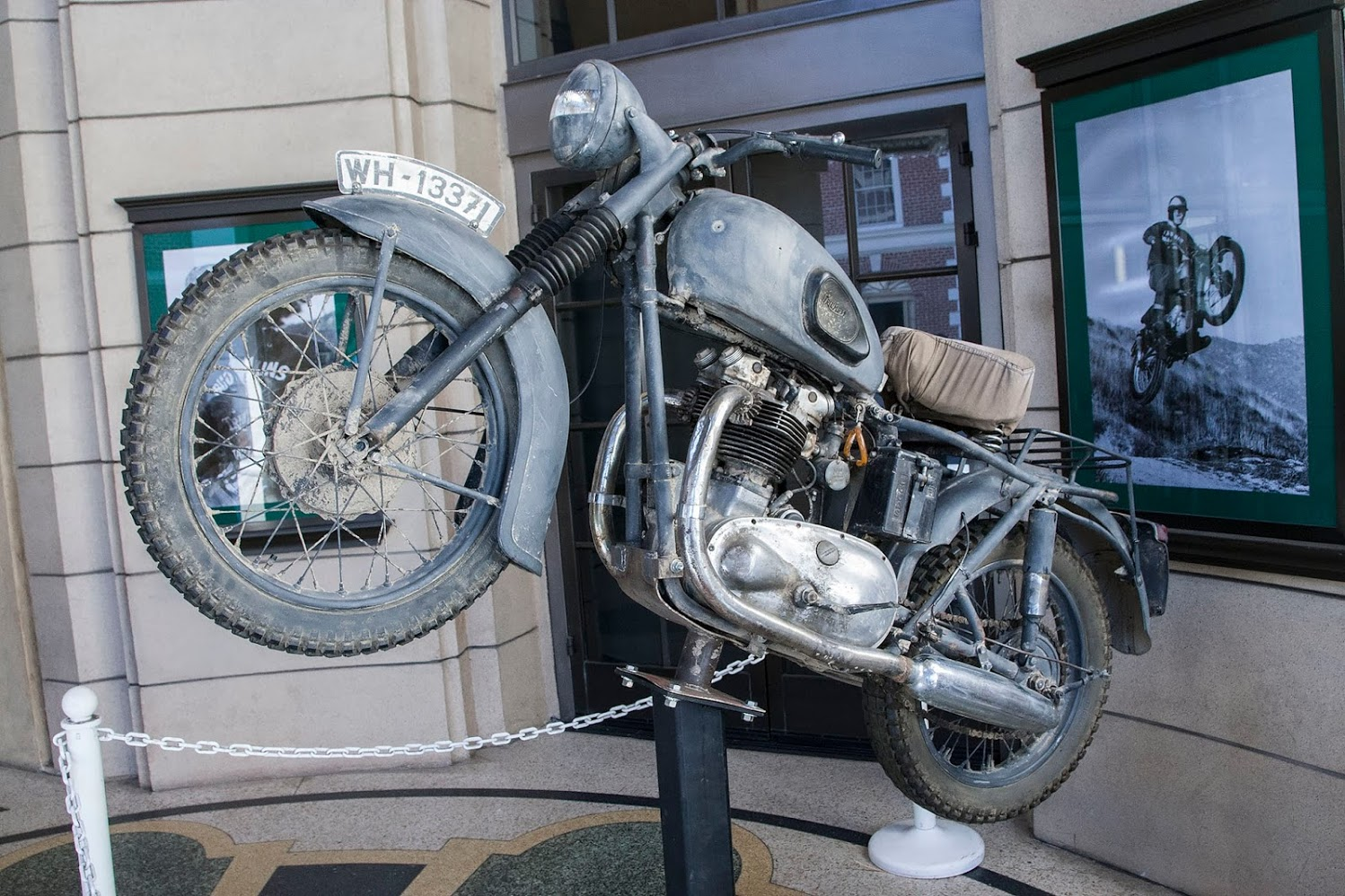
Replica of the motorcycle used by McQueen and Ekins.

The motorcycle chase scenes with the barbed wire fences were shot on meadows outside Füssen, and the "barbed wire" that Hilts crashes into before being recaptured was simulated by strips of rubber tied around barbless wire, constructed by the cast and crew in their spare time. Insurance concerns prevented McQueen from performing the film's notable motorcycle leap, which was done by his friend and fellow cycle enthusiast Bud Ekins, who resembled McQueen from a distance. When Johnny Carson later tried to congratulate McQueen for the jump during a broadcast of The Tonight Show, McQueen said, "It wasn't me. That was Bud Ekins." However, McQueen and Australian Motocross champion Tim Gibbes both performed the stunt on camera for fun, and according to second unit director Robert Relyea, the stunt in the final cut of the movie could have been performed by any of the three men. Other parts of the chase were done by McQueen, playing both Hilts and the soldiers chasing him, because of his skill on a motorcycle. The motorcycle was a Triumph TR6 Trophy which was painted to look like a German machine. The restored machine is currently on display at Triumph's factory at Hinckley, England. Filming started on June 4, 1962 and ended in October 1962.

== Historical accuracy ==
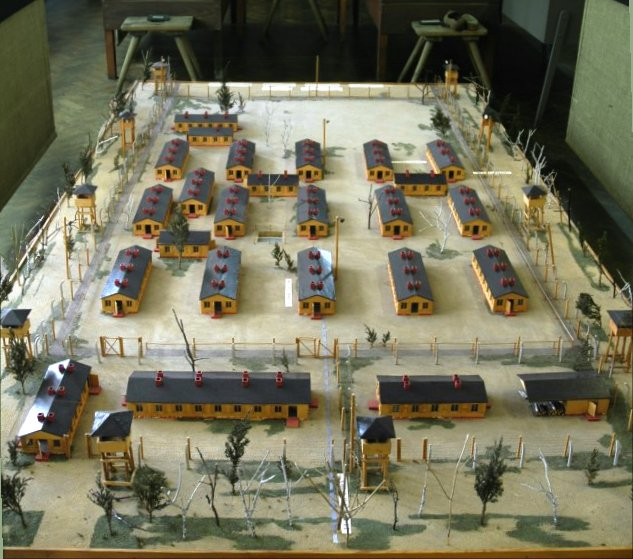
Model of the set used to film The Great Escape. It depicts a smaller version of a single compound in Stalag Luft III. The model is now at the museum near where the prison camp was located.

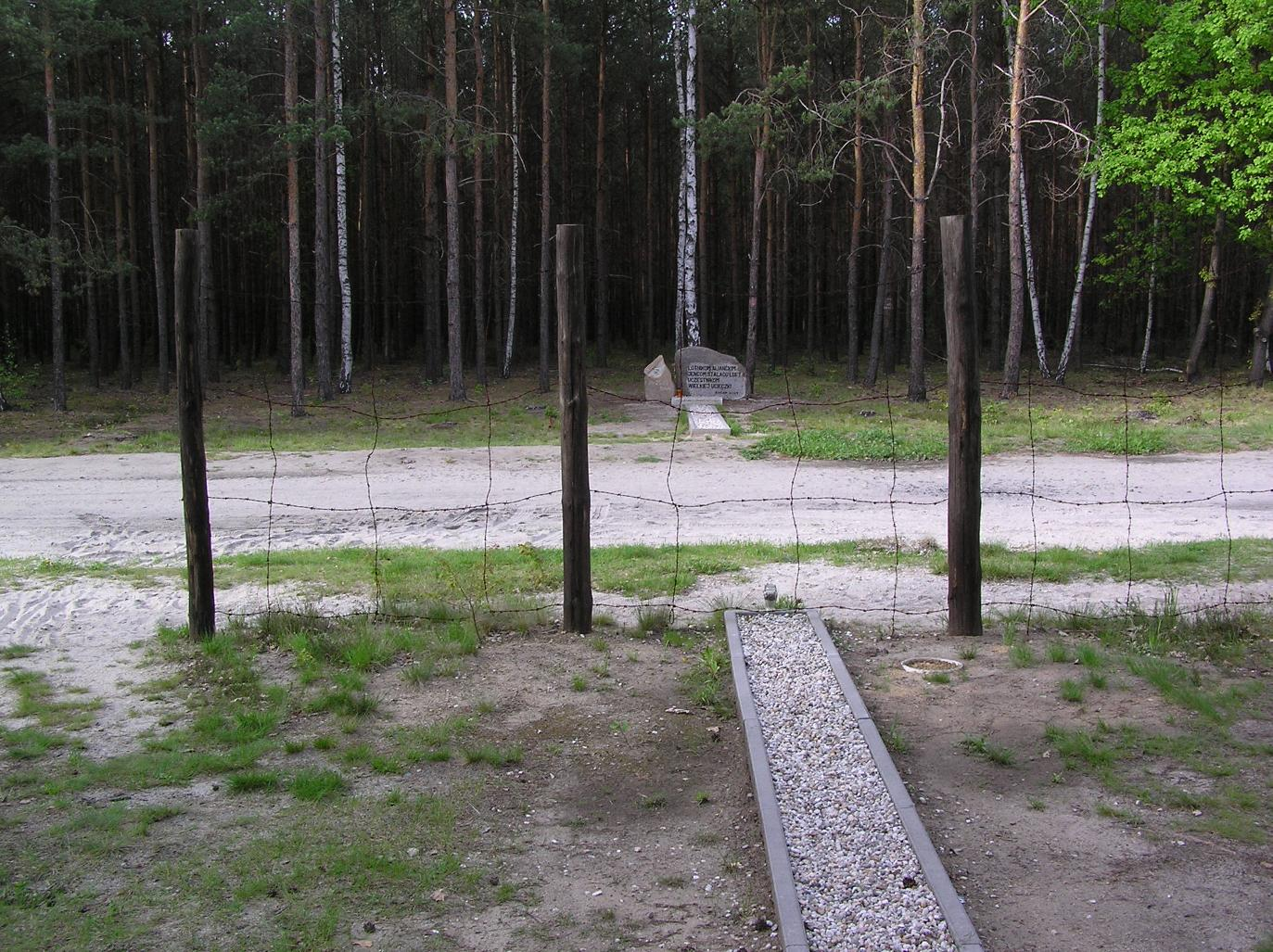
End of the real "Harry" tunnel (on the other side of the road) showing how it does not reach the cover of the trees

The film accurately represented many details of the escape, including the layout of the camp, the different escape plans employed, and the fact that only three escapees successfully made it to freedom. The characters are fictitious, but are based on real men, in most cases being composites of several. However, a number of changes were made to increase the film's drama and appeal to an American audience, with some scenes being heavily or completely fictionalised. The screenwriters also significantly increased the involvement of American POWs in the escape. A few American officers in the camp initially helped dig the tunnels and worked on the early plans, but they were moved away seven months before the escape, which ended their involvement. The real escape was by largely British and other Allied personnel, with the exception of American Johnnie Dodge, who was a British army officer. The film omits the crucial role that Canadians played in building the tunnels and in the escape itself. Of the 1,800 or so POWs, 600 were involved in preparations: 150 of those were Canadian. Wally Floody, an RCAF pilot and former miner who was the real-life "tunnel king", was engaged as a technical advisor for the film.

During filming, actor Donald Pleasence kindly offered advice to director John Sturges, to which he was politely asked to keep his "opinions" to himself. Later, when another actor on set informed Sturges that Pleasence was actually imprisoned in a German POW camp, Sturges requested his technical advice and input on historical accuracy from that point forward.

Ramsey tells Von Luger that it is the sworn duty of every officer to attempt escape. In reality, there was no such requirement in the King's Regulations, or in any form of international convention.

The film shows the tunnel codenamed "Tom" with its entrance under a stove and "Harry" in a drain sump in a washroom. In reality, the entrance to "Dick" was the drain sump, "Harry" was under the stove, and "Tom" was in a darkened corner next to a stove chimney.

Former POWs asked the filmmakers to exclude details about the help they received from their home countries, such as maps, papers, and tools hidden in gift packages, lest it jeopardise future POW escapes. The filmmakers complied.

The film omits any mention that many Germans willingly helped in the escape itself. The film suggests that the forgers were able to make near-exact replicas of just about any pass that was used in Nazi Germany. In reality, the forgers received a great deal of assistance from Germans who lived many hundreds of miles away on the other side of the country. Several German guards, who were openly anti-Nazi, also willingly gave the prisoners items and assistance of any kind to aid their escape. The need for such accuracy produced much eyestrain, but unlike in the film, there were no cases of blindness. Some, such as Frank Knight, gave up forging because of the strain, but he certainly did not suffer the same ocular fate as the character of Colin Blythe in the film. In fact, no one in the film says that Colin Blythe's blindness is the result of eyestrain. He identifies his problem as "progressive myopia", suggesting that he has not only heard of the condition but has also been diagnosed.

The film depicts the escape taking place in ideal weather conditions, whereas at the time much was done in freezing temperatures, and snow lay thick on the ground. In reality there were no escapes by aircraft or motorcycle: McQueen requested the motorcycle sequence, which shows off his skills as a keen motorcyclist. He did the stunt riding himself (except for the final jump, done by Bud Ekins).

In the film, Hilts incapacitates a German soldier for his motorcycle and uniform, Ashley-Pitt kills Kuhn, a Gestapo officer, when he recognizes Bartlett at a Gestapo checkpoint at a railway station and is shot dead in return, Hendley knocks out a German guard at the airfield, and Sedgwick witnesses the killing of German officers at a French cafe by the French Resistance. No German personnel were killed or injured by the real escapees. Blythe is shot and mortally wounded by a German after their plane crashes just short of the border; this incident never happened. The film depicts the three prisoners who escape to freedom as British, Polish, and Australian; in reality, they were Norwegians (Jens Müller and Per Bergsland) and Dutch (Bram van der Stok).

At the end of the film, three truckloads of recaptured POWs drive in three directions. One truck contains 20 prisoners who are invited to stretch their legs in a field, whereupon they are all machine gunned in a single massacre, with the implication that the prisoners in the other two trucks were killed in the same manner. In reality, the majority of the POWs were shot individually or in pairs, killed by pistol shots taken by Gestapo officers; however, at least ten of them were killed in a manner like that portrayed in the film: Dutchy Swain, Chaz Hall, Brian Evans, Wally Valenta, George McGill, Pat Langford, Edgar Humphreys, Włodzimierz Kolanowski, Bob Stewart, and Henry "Hank" Birkland.

In 2009, seven POWs returned to Stalag Luft III for the 65th anniversary of the escape and watched the film. According to the veterans, many details of the first half depicting life in the camp were authentic, e.g. the death of Ives, who tries to scale the fence, and the actual digging of the tunnels. The film has kept the memory of the 50 executed airmen alive for decades and has made their story known worldwide, if in a distorted form. British author Guy Walters notes that a pivotal scene in the film where MacDonald blunders by replying in English to a suspicious Gestapo officer saying, "Good luck", is now so strongly imprinted that historians have accepted it as a real event, and that it was Bushell's partner Bernard Scheidhauer who made the error. However, Walters points out that a historical account says that one of the two men said "yes" in English in response to a Kripo man's questions without any mention of "good luck" and notes that as Scheidhauer was French, and Bushell's first language was English, it seems likely that if a slip did take place, it was made by Bushell himself, and says the "good luck" scene should be regarded as fiction.

== Soundtrack ==
The film's iconic music was composed and conducted by Elmer Bernstein, who gave each major character his own musical motif based on the Great Escape's main theme, and performed by the Hollywood Studio Symphony. Its enduring popularity helped Bernstein live off the score's royalties for the rest of his life. Critics have said the film score succeeds because it uses rousing militaristic motifs with interludes of warmer softer themes that humanizes the prisoners and endears them to audiences; the music also captures the bravery and defiance of the POWs. The main title's patriotic march has since become popular in Britain, particularly with fans of the England national football team. However, in 2016, the sons of Elmer Bernstein openly criticized the use of the Great Escape theme by the Vote Leave campaign in the UK Brexit referendum, saying "Our father would never have allowed UKIP to use his music" because he would have strongly opposed the party.

Intrada Records (release)

In 2011 Intrada, a company specializing in film soundtracks, released a digitized re-mastered version of the full film score based on the original 1/4" two-track stereo sessions and original 1/2" three-channel stereo masters.

=== Disc one ===
Original Motion Picture Soundtrack
No.	Title	Length
1.	"Main Title"	2:30
2.	"At First Glance"	3:07
3.	"Premature Plans"	2:28
4.	"If At Once"	2:31
5.	"Forked"	1:28
6.	"Cooler"	1:59
7.	"Mole"	1:28
8.	""X"/Tonight We Dig"	1:30
9.	"The Scrounger/Blythe"	3:50
10.	"Water Faucet"	1:23
11.	"Interruptus"	1:33
12.	"The Plan/The Sad Ives"	1:43
13.	"Green Thumbs"	2:28
14.	"Hilts And Ives"	0:38
15.	"Cave In"	2:01
16.	"Restless Men"	1:56
17.	"Booze"	1:47
18.	""Yankee Doodle""	0:55
19.	"Discovery"	3:40
Total length:		57:35

=== Disc two ===
Original Motion Picture Soundtrack (Continued)
No.	Title	Length
1.	"Various Troubles"	3:52
2.	"Panic"	2:05
3.	"Pin Trick"	0:59
4.	"Hendley's Risk"	1:43
5.	"Released Again/Escape Time"	5:25
6.	"20 Feet Short"	3:06
7.	"Foul Up"	2:37
8.	"At The Station"	1:33
9.	"On The Road"	3:27
10.	"The Chase/First Casualty"	6:49
11.	"Flight Plan"	2:09
12.	"More Action/Hilts Captured"	6:07
13.	"Road's End"	2:06
14.	"Betrayal"	2:20
15.	"Three Gone/Home Again"	3:13
16.	"Finale/The Cast"	2:47
Total length:		1:18:58

=== Disc three ===
Original 1963 United Artists Score Album
No.	Title	Length
1.	"Main Title"	2:07
2.	"Premature Plans"	2:08
3.	"Cooler And Mole"	2:26
4.	"Blythe"	2:13
5.	"Discovery"	2:54
6.	"Various Troubles"	2:40
7.	"On The Road"	2:54
8.	"Betrayal"	2:05
9.	"Hendley's Risk"	2:24
10.	"Road's End"	2:00
11.	"More Action"	1:57
12.	"The Chase"	2:49
13.	"Finale"	3:14
Total length:		49:11

== Reception ==
=== Box office ===
The Great Escape grossed $11.7 million at the box office, after a budget of $4 million. It became one of the highest-grossing films of 1963, despite heavy competition. In the years since its release, its audience has broadened, cementing its status as a cinema classic. It was entered into the 3rd Moscow International Film Festival, where McQueen won the Silver Prize for Best Actor.

=== Critical response ===
Contemporary reviews for the film were mostly positive. However, in 1963, The New York Times critic Bosley Crowther wrote: "But for much longer than is artful or essential, The Great Escape grinds out its tormenting story without a peek beneath the surface of any man, without a real sense of human involvement. It's a strictly mechanical adventure with make-believe men." British film critic Leslie Halliwell described it as a "pretty good but overlong POW adventure with a tragic ending". The Time magazine reviewer wrote in 1963: "The use of color photography is unnecessary and jarring, but little else is wrong with this film. With accurate casting, a swift screenplay, and authentic German settings, Producer-Director John Sturges has created classic cinema of action. There is no sermonizing, no soul probing, no sex. The Great Escape is simply great escapism".

In 2025, The Hollywood Reporter listed The Great Escape as having the best stunts of 1963.

=== Accolades ===
- Nominated Academy Award for Film Editing (Ferris Webster)
- Nominated Golden Globe Award for Best Picture
- Winner Moscow International Film Festival Best Actor (Steve McQueen)
- Nominated Moscow International Film Festival Grand Prix (John Sturges)
- Selected National Board of Review Top Ten Films of Year
- Nominated Writers Guild of America Best Written American Drama (James Clavell, W. R. Burnett) (Screenplay Adaptation)
- 19th place in AFI's 100 Years...100 Thrills

== Sequel ==
A fictional, made-for-television sequel, The Great Escape II: The Untold Story, was released in 1988, starring Christopher Reeve, and directed by Jud Taylor (who played Goff in the original film). The film is not a true sequel, dramatizing the escape itself just as the first film does, but mostly using the real names of the individuals involved (whereas the original film fictionalized them with composite characters). It depicts the hunt for those responsible for the murder of the 50 Allied airmen. Donald Pleasence appears in a supporting role as a member of the SS.

== Legacy ==
On 24 March 2014, the 70th anniversary of the escape, the RAF staged a commemoration of the escape attempt, with 50 serving personnel each carrying a photograph of one of the shot men.

On 24 March 2019, the RAF held another event for the 75th anniversary of the escape. There was a screening of the film at London's Eventim Hammersmith Apollo, hosted by Dan Snow. The film was simulcast with other cinemas throughout the UK.

=== Modern appraisals ===
The Great Escape continues to receive acclaim from modern critics. On review aggregator Rotten Tomatoes, the film holds an approval rating of 94% based on 53 reviews. The site's critics consensus reads, "With its impeccably slow-building story and a cast for the ages, The Great Escape is an all-time action classic."

In a 2006 poll in the United Kingdom, regarding the family film that television viewers would most want to see on Christmas Day, The Great Escape came in third, and was first among the choices of male viewers. In an article for the British Film Institute, "10 great prisoner of war films", updated in August 2018, Samuel Wigley wrote that watching films like The Great Escape and the 1955 British film The Colditz Story, "for all their moments of terror and tragedy, is to delight in captivity in times of war as a wonderful game for boys, an endless Houdini challenge to slip through the enemy's fingers. Often based on true stories of escape, they have the viewer marvelling at the ingenuity and seemingly unbreakable spirit of imprisoned soldiers." He described The Great Escape as "the epitome of the war-is-fun action film", which became "a fixture of family TV viewing".

== In popular culture ==
- The 1986 The Great Escape video game was released for the Commodore 64, ZX Spectrum, MS-DOS. It follows an unnamed prisoner of war who has been interned in a POW camp somewhere in northern Germany in 1942.
- Another video game, The Great Escape was released in 2003 for Windows, Xbox and PlayStation 2. The plot follows that of the film, except there are also levels featuring some of the characters' first captures and early escape attempts, as well as a changed ending.
- The films Chicken Run, Reservoir Dogs, the 1998 remake of The Parent Trap, Top Secret!, Charlie's Angels, The Tao of Steve, Naked Gun 33 1/3: The Final Insult, Inglourious Basterds, and Once Upon a Time in Hollywood all contain references or homages to the film.
- Monty Python's Flying Circus, Hogan's Heroes, Nash Bridges, Seinfeld, Get Smart, Fugget About It, Archer, Goodness Gracious Me, Shaun the Sheep, The Simpsons and Red Dwarf have all parodied or paid homage to the film.
- Bernstein's Great Escape theme tune has been taken up by the Pukka Pies England Band, a small brass band who have played in the crowd at England football team matches since 1996. They released an arrangement of the theme as a single for the 1998 FIFA World Cup and a newer version for UEFA Euro 2000.
- Japanese novelist Hiro Arikawa was influenced by both The Great Escape and Gamera franchise and took inspirations from them.

== See also ==
- List of American films of 1963
- List of films considered the best
- The Bridge on the River Kwai, a similar film also released to critical acclaim
