= Patrick Langford =

Canadian military personnel (1919–1944)

Patrick Wilson Langford
- Born: Patrick Wilson Langford; 4 November 1919; Edmonton, Alberta, Canada
- Died: 31 March 1944 (aged 24) near Görlitz, Germany
- Burial place: Poznan Old Garrison Cemetery, Poland
- Military career
- Allegiance: Canada
- Branch: Royal Canadian Air Force
- Service years: 1940–1944
- Rank: Flight Lieutenant
- Nickname: Pat
- Service number: C/1631
- Unit: No. 16 Operational Training Unit RAF
- Conflicts: World War II: Channel Front (POW)
- Awards: Mentioned in Despatches

Patrick Wilson Langford (4 November 1919 – 31 March 1944), was a Royal Canadian Air Force officer, the pilot instructor aboard a Vickers Wellington bomber, who was taken prisoner during the Second World War. He took part in the 'Great Escape' from Stalag Luft III in March 1944, but was one of the men recaptured and subsequently shot by the Gestapo.

== Pre-war life ==
Langford was born in Edmonton, Alberta, Canada, the son of Olive Mary and Captain Richard Wilson Langford an English couple. His father was Forest Ranger at the Jasper National Park and its first resident official and Chief Warden from 1911. He returned to England to serve in World War I and settled back in Canada at Jasper with his new wife in 1919 where they started their family. Patrick was their eldest son. He was educated at Jasper Public and High Schools from September 1926 to June 1936 and Banff High School from September 1936 to June 1937 and worked for Brewster Transport as a driver during the summers and also for six months on engineering surveys in the National Parks as a chainman and on instrument work.

== War service ==
On 29 January 1940 in Edmonton, Alberta, Langford joined in the Royal Canadian Air Force as a Regular Service officer and was commissioned. He was assigned to Calgary Aero Club flying Gypsy Moth aircraft and then to No.1 Initial Training Squadron Toronto, serving at RCAF Camp Borden he was awarded his aircrew brevet pilot's flying badge on 19 August 1940. Langford was promoted flying officer and posted to Station Trenton on 5 October 1940. He transferred to No.6 Service Flying Training School at Dunnville on 21 November 1940 serving there as a flying instructor to 7 April 1942, during which time he was promoted to temporary flight lieutenant on 9 August 1941. Langford flew to England to begin operational flying and landed on 9 April 1942. He joined No. 16 Operational Training Unit RAF flying Wellington bombers on 19 May 1942.

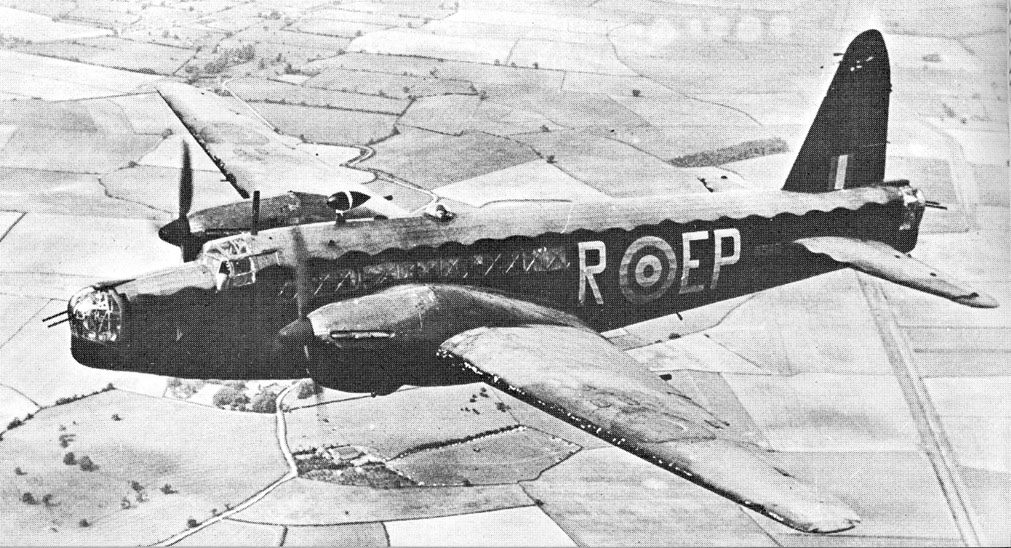
The Merlin-engined Wellington Mark II. This aircraft belongs to No. 104 Sqn.

== Prisoner of war ==
On the night of 28–29 July 1942 at 22:14 hours he took off in a Wellington Mark Ic bomber (serial number R1450) from RAF Upper Heyford to bomb the German shipbuilding and port city of Hamburg flying as Instructor with a student crew. The bomber was shot down over Lübeck in northern Germany by a Luftwaffe night fighter and crashed killing 3 of the crew, the pilot was taken prisoner unhurt but Langford and the rear gunner were taken prisoner seriously injured. He had baled out with his parachute on fire and was badly burned and hospitalized for 2 months by the Germans during which time he was promoted to full flight lieutenant before being sent on 1 October 1942 to Stalag Luft III in the province of Lower Silesia near the town of Sagan (now Żagań in Poland).

== 'Great Escape' ==
As prisoner No. 710 Langford was involved in the planning and excavation of the tunnel code-named "Harry" which was located under the barrack's stove in Room 23 of Block 104. He was the "trapfuehrer" responsible to ensure that the red hot stove on its tiled piece of removable flooring was back in place over the tunnel whenever the guards were nearby. He mastered his technique to a point that he could close the trap door above the tunnellers cushioned with blankets to kill any hollow sound, and get the stove in place with carefully replaced dust and dirt within 20 seconds of a guard approaching. Langford saved the tunnel from discovery on several occasions. The tunnel was completed in early March 1944 measuring 106.07 m (348 ft) in length and the date for the break-out was set for 24 March. Approximately 600 airmen had worked on various aspects of the tunnel's construction. A list of 220 people was compiled for the actual escape but only 76 managed to get through the tunnel before it was discovered by the German guards.

Memorial to "The Fifty" down the road toward Żagań (Langford is on the right)

He was one of the 76 men who escaped the prison camp on the night of 24–25 March 1944 in the escape now famous as "the Great Escape". Having got clear of the camp Langford was in a party of officers who fought their way through the snow and bitter cold walking as fast as they could, they kept pushing onwards despite the weather and survived freezing nights outdoors only to be recaptured on 28 March 1944. He was in the party with Ian Cross, Jack Grisman, Sandy Gunn and Tom Leigh held at Görlitz Civil Prison, where on the morning of 31 March 1944 Keith Ogilvie saw Edgar Humphreys, Dutchy Swain, Chaz Hall, Brian Evans, Wally Valenta, George McGill, Pat Langford, "Adam" Wlodzimierz Kolanowski, Bob Stewart and "Hank" Henry Birkland being led away to a covered truck, They were all shot in a clearing off the Görlitz to Sagan road just outside Görlitz and cremated at Liegnitz by the Gestapo. Langford was one of the 50 escapers executed and murdered by the Gestapo. Originally his remains were buried at Sagan, he is now buried in part of the Poznan Old Garrison Cemetery. he is also commemorated by the Royal Canadian Air Force.

His name was amongst those in the list of the murdered prisoners which was published when news broke on or about 19–20 May 1944. and he is also mentioned in the "Ottawa Citizen" on 27 February 1946.

Nationalities of the 50 executed
United Kingdom 21 British
Canada 6 Canadian
Poland 6 Polish
Australia 5 Australian
South Africa 3 South African
New Zealand 2 New Zealanders
Norway 2 Norwegian
Belgium 1 Belgian
Czechoslovakia 1 Czechoslovak
France 1 Frenchman
Greece 1 Greek
Lithuania 1 Lithuanian

== Awards ==
Mentioned in Despatches for conspicuous gallantry as a prisoner of war (none of the other relevant decorations then available could be awarded posthumously). It was published in a supplement to the London Gazette on 8 June 1944.

== Other victims ==
See Stalag Luft III murders

The Gestapo executed a group of 50 of the recaptured prisoners representing almost all of the nationalities involved in the escape. Post-war investigations saw a number of those guilty of the murders tracked down, arrested and tried for their crimes.
