= George McGill (RCAF officer) =

Royal Canadian Air Force officer

George Edward McGill
- Born: George Edward McGill; 14 April 1918; Toronto, Ontario, Canada
- Died: 31 March 1944 (aged 25) near
- Burial place: Poznan Old Garrison Cemetery, Poland
- Military career
- Allegiance: Canada
- Branch: Royal Canadian Air Force
- Service years: 1940–1944
- Rank: Flight Lieutenant
- Service number: J/5312
- Unit: No. 103 Squadron RAF
- Conflicts: World War II: Channel Front (POW)
- Awards: Mentioned in Despatches

George Edward McGill (14 April 1918 – 31 March 1944), was a Royal Canadian Air Force officer, the observer (navigator) of a Vickers Wellington bomber, who was taken prisoner during the Second World War. He took part in the 'Great Escape' from Stalag Luft III in March 1944, but was one of the men recaptured and subsequently shot by the Gestapo.

== Pre-war life ==
McGill was the son of George Wellington and Rita (née Strahmayer) McGill of Toronto, Ontario. He studied chemical engineering at the University of Toronto between 1936 and 1938 . His wife was Elizabeth Louise (née Goodman) and his son Peter Edward.

== War service ==
McGill enlisted in the Royal Canadian Air Force at Toronto on 3 September 1940 and trained at No.1 Initial Training Squadron from 9 November 1940, graduating and being promoted Leading Aircraftman on 8 December 1940. His initial flight training as an observer and bomb aimer commenced 2 March 1941, he was promoted Sergeant on 12 April 1941 and posted to No.1 Air Navigation School. McGill was commissioned pilot officer on 13 May 1941. He sailed from Canada on 14 July 1941 and completed his training in England at No. 21 Operational Training Unit. McGill was posted to No. 103 Squadron RAF on 17 October 1941 and commenced operations in Vickers Wellington bombers.

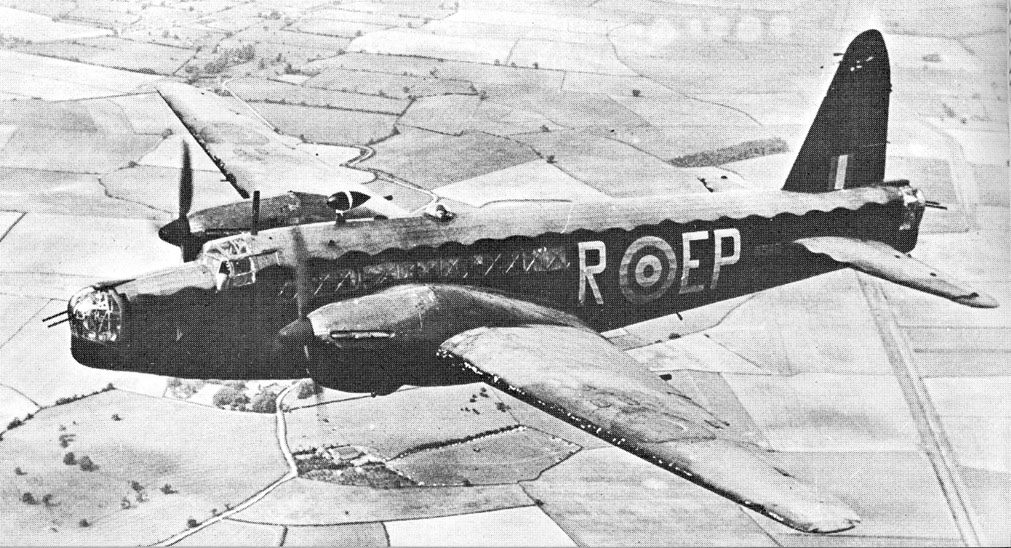
The Merlin-engined Wellington Mark II. This aircraft belongs to No. 104 Sqn.

== Prisoner of war ==
On 10 January 1942 McGill was a member of the crew of Vickers Wellington (serial number "Z1142") attacking the German naval port city of Wilhelmshaven. Over the target the bomber caught fire and filled with smoke. The pilot headed away from the attack but took care that he was not over the sea before ordering the crew to bale out. McGill and the others baled out becoming prisoners of war.

Arriving at prison camp Spangenberg in February 1942 he joined a small group of aircrew working towards an escape, one of the men was Chaz Hall who later participated in the Great Escape.

McGill was next held at Stalag Luft III in the province of Lower Silesia near the town of Sagan (now Żagań in Poland).

During his time as a prisoner McGill was promoted flying officer on 13 May 1942 and then flight lieutenant on 13 May 1943.

== 'Great Escape' ==
Memorial to "The Fifty" down the road toward Żagań (Langford is on the right)

McGarr was amongst the officers recaptured relatively locally who were taken to Görlitz prison 36 miles south from Sagan. George McGill, Henry Birkland, Patrick Langford, Mike Casey, George Wiley, Tom Leigh, John Pohe, Cyril Swain, Charles Hall, Brian Evans, Wlodzimierz Kolanowski and Bob Stewart were taken away in black cars by plain clothes Gestapo officials on 30 and 31 March 1944 and were never seen alive again. Another account states that on 31 March 1944 a group of 10 officers including Henry Birkland were taken away.

The plates on their cremation urns showed that they had been cremated at Liegnitz (now Legnica), 55 miles to the east of Sagan, but no dates were given. So he became one of the 50 executed and murdered by the Gestapo. His remains, which were originally buried at Sagan, were moved in November 1948 to the Poznan Old Garrison Cemetery to lie beside those of his fellow escapers.

His name was amongst those in the list of the murdered prisoners which was published when news broke on or about 19–20 May 1944, and he is also mentioned in the "Ottawa Citizen" on 27 February 1946.

Nationalities of the 50 executed
21 British
6 Canadian
6 Polish
5 Australian
3 South African
2 New Zealanders
2 Norwegian
1 Belgian
1 Czechoslovak
1 Frenchman
1 Greek
Lithuania 1 Lithuanian

== Awards ==
McGill received a Mentioned in Despatches for conspicuous gallantry as a prisoner of war as none of the other relevant decorations then available could be awarded posthumously. It was awarded in (Canadian Government) AFRO 1729/44 dated 11 August 1944 and published in a supplement to the London Gazette on 8 June 1944.

== Other victims ==
See Stalag Luft III murders

The Gestapo executed a group of 50 of the recaptured prisoners representing almost all of the nationalities involved in the escape. Post-war investigations saw a number of those guilty of the murders tracked down, arrested and tried for their crimes.
