= Floody =

Floody is a surname. Notable people with the surname include:

- Nilo Floody (1921–2013), Chilean modern pentathlete
- Wally Floody (1918–1989), Royal Canadian Air Force officer
