= At First Glance =

"At First Glance" may refer to:

- A 1963 song on the soundtrack for The Great Escape (film)
- A 2018 song on the album Watermusic by Oh Land
