= Leslie Broderick =

- Born: 19 May 1921; Wandsworth, London, England
- Died: 8 April 2013 (aged 91)
- Military career
- Allegiance: United Kingdom
- Branch: Royal Air Force
- Service years: 1939–1945
- Rank: Flight lieutenant
- Unit: No. 106 Squadron RAF
- Conflicts: World War II

Leslie Charles James Broderick (19 May 1921 – 8 April 2013) was a British World War II Royal Air Force Avro Lancaster bomber pilot and teacher who was a prisoner of war in Stalag Luft III and one of the last three survivors of the "Great Escape".

== Early life ==
Les was born in Wandsworth, London and educated at Bancroft's School. After joining the Territorial Army in 1939 he was posted to a searchlight unit on Canvey Island.

== Royal Air Force Service and the "Great Escape" ==
In 1940 he transferred to the Royal Air force, trained as a pilot in Texas and was commissioned as an officer. He then served in No. 106 Squadron RAF and completed 18 bombing missions before being forced to crash land in France when returning from a raid on Stuttgart and four of his crew were killed. He was then imprisoned in Stalag Luft III and became a member of the escape tunnelling team. There were three tunnels being dug named Tom, Dick and Harry and Broderick worked for two months in claustrophobic conditions on Dick, but Harry was completed first and Broderick was 52nd on the escape list to go through that tunnel on the night of 24 March 1944. He and two companions named Henry Birkland and Denys Street managed to get clear of the area through nearby forests but they surrendered three days later having made little progress in cold and wet conditions. His companions were among the 50 escapees who were executed on the orders of Adolf Hitler but Broderick was among the 23 who were spared and he was returned to the camp. In 1945 he survived the 'Long March' westwards away from the Red Army.

== Later life ==
He was demobilised in 1945 and after working as a primary school teacher on Canvey Island he moved to South Africa in 1955 where he continued to work as a teacher until his retirement. He was married with two sons.
