= St. Nikolaus parish church (Pfronten) =

- Pfarrkirche St. Nikolaus
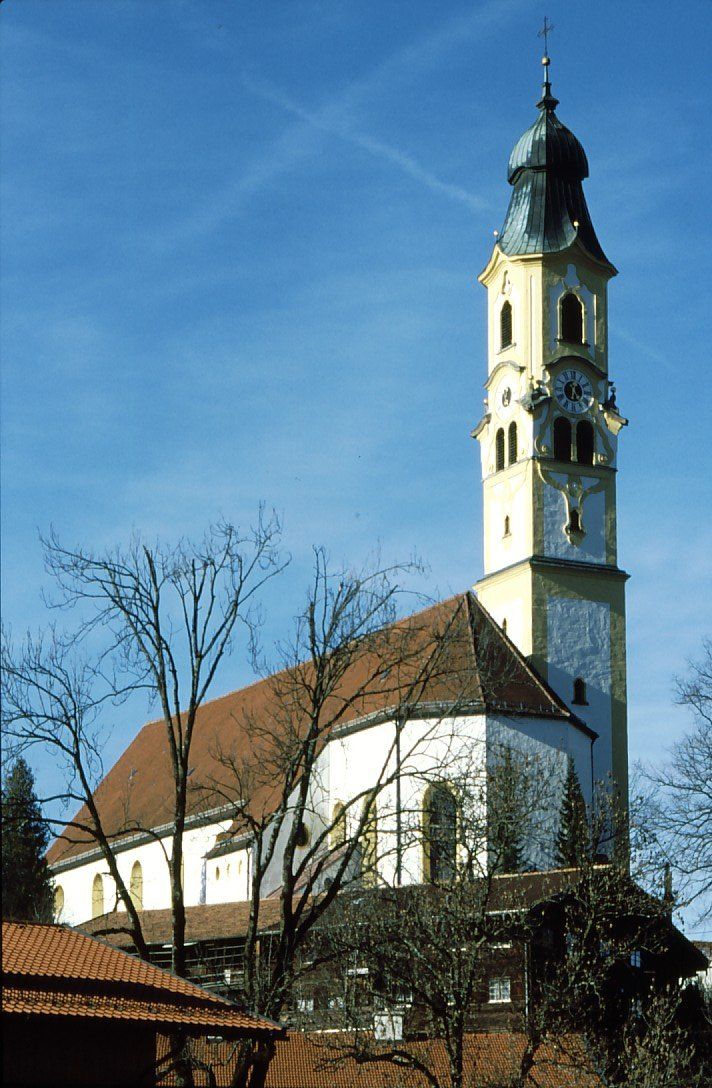
- St. Nikolaus parish church
- 47°35′09″N 10°33′27″E
- Country: Germany
- Denomination: Catholic
- Website: www.stnikolaus-pfronten.de

Administration
- Diocese: Augsburg
- Parish: Pfronten

Clergy
- Pastor: Bernd Leumann

The St. Nikolaus parish church (German: Pfarrkirche St. Nikolaus) is the parish church of Pfronten in the Ostallgäu district of Bavaria in Germany.

The ceiling fresco is the work of Josef Keller.

== In popular culture ==
The exterior of the church appears in the movie The Great Escape.
