= Tony Hayter =

Anthony Ross Henzell Hayter
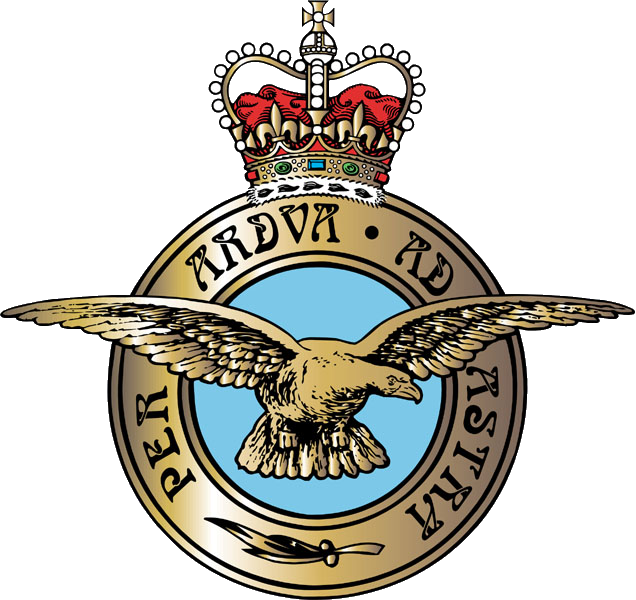
- Born: Anthony Ross Henzell Hayter; 20 May 1920; Farnborough, Hampshire
- Died: 6 April 1944 (aged 23); Natzweiler
- Burial place: Poznan Old Garrison Cemetery, Poland
- Military career
- Allegiance: United Kingdom
- Branch: Royal Air Force
- Service years: 1938–1944
- Rank: Flight Lieutenant
- Nickname: Tony
- Service number: 42124
- Units: No. 57 Squadron RAF; Coastal Command; No. 148 Squadron RAF
- Conflicts: World War II: Channel Front; Battle of France; North African Campaign (POW)
- Awards: Mentioned in Despatches

Anthony Ross Henzell Hayter (20 May 1920 – 6 April 1944) was a Royal Air Force Vickers Wellington bomber pilot who was taken prisoner during the Second World War. He took part in the 'Great Escape' from Stalag Luft III in March 1944, but was recaptured and subsequently shot by the Gestapo.

== Pre-war life ==
Hayter was born in Farnborough, Hampshire the son of Lieutenant Colonel Herbert Roche Hayter, D.S.O., and Elsie Helen Evelyn Winterton Hayter. His father, who had seen extensive military service in the Second Boer War (1899–1902) and in World War I, retired when Hayter was aged two. Their family settled at Burghclere Grange, a large rectory and small farm in Berkshire. He grew up in a sporting atmosphere particularly enjoying swimming and yachting. In 1929, he flew in his step-brother's bi-plane aircraft, and it instilled a love of flight in him. He was educated at Marlborough College from 1933 to 1938 and graduated determined to join the Royal Air Force. Late in 1938, he was accepted for a short service commission. After basic training, he commenced his flight training in March 1939. On 13 May 1939, having earned his pilot's aircrew brevet, he was commissioned acting pilot officer. By the outbreak of war in September 1939, he was with the Advanced Training School at RAF Hullavington about to convert to Bristol Blenheim light bombers.

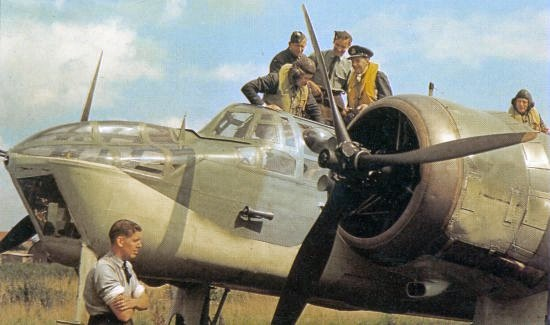
Blenheim Mark IV of 21 Squadron at Bodney in August 1941

== War service ==
On 6 November 1939 he was confirmed as pilot officer, during a winter of intensive training. On 13 April 1940 he was posted to No. 57 Squadron RAF based at Montdidier in northern France.

Serving operationally as a pilot with No. 57 Squadron RAF, he went into action on 10 May 1940 carrying out a photo-reconnaissance mission of a section of the German-Dutch border. During this mission, he was attacked by three Messerschmitt Bf 109 fighters. His aircraft was machine gunned, although he did manage to escape. Back at his base, 237 bullet holes were counted in the aircraft. Ten days later, the squadron returned to England. The squadrons of Bristol Blenheim and Fairey Battle light bombers had been almost wiped out in ten days, the majority of their airmen killed in action.

Very shortly after their return, Hayter was assigned to fly a military officer into one of the last remaining airfields accessible to British forces in France. He carried plans for the evacuation of troops from that region. Hayter managed to land, avoiding multiple bomb craters. As the airfield was attacked, he took cover in a ditch, and once the officer had delivered his package, he brought him back to England, a feat earning him a mention in dispatches.

On 24 June 1940, he was transferred temporarily to RAF Coastal Command in Scotland. About 4 weeks later, while awaiting permission to take off, his Bristol Blenheim was struck by a Vickers Wellington, which crippled his observer and destroyed his aircraft. He was promoted to flying officer on 6 November 1940. His attachment was uneventful after that, and over the winter of 1940/41 he converted to fly the Vickers Wellington heavy bomber on which he returned to operational flying in raids on 18 March 1941 against an oil terminal in the Netherlands and 27 March 1941 against the German target Cologne before bombing Berlin on 9 April 1941.

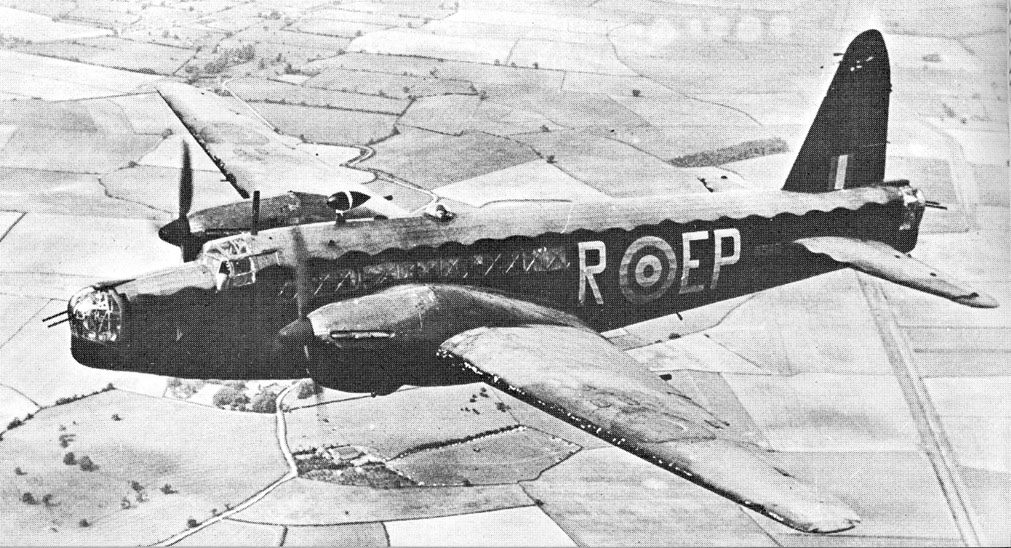
The Merlin-engined Wellington Mark II. This aircraft actually belongs to No. 104 Sqn. Notice the criss-cross geodesic construction through the perspex fuselage panels.

On 23 April 1941 he was posted to the Middle East and left for Gibraltar, taking off for Malta on 6 May 1941 flying a diversionary mission from there before being posted to No. 253 Wing Communications Flight in Egypt on 12 July 1941. By September he was acting flight commander being promoted to flight lieutenant on 6 November 1941.

On 10 January 1942 Hayter as assigned to No. 148 Squadron RAF flying Vickers Wellington bombers over the Western Desert where on 8 February 1942 he had to crashland Wellington Mark II (serial number "Z8430" near Wadi Natrun after engine failure. Operations continued from RAF Luqa, Malta mainly against German occupied Benghazi over the next two months.

== Prisoner of war ==
On 23 April 1942 at 2045 hours Hayter took off from RAF Luqa flying Vickers Wellington Mark Ic (serial number "BB483", squadron code "Q-Queen") on a mission to bomb enemy positions at Comiso, Sicily. Two of the squadron's aircraft were shot down in the target area and with the exception of Hayter all of the crews died, they are buried at Catania War Cemetery on Sicily. He parachuted to the ground and was taken prisoner.

Within two weeks he was Prisoner No. 199 at Stalag Luft III in the province of Lower Silesia near the town of Sagan (now Żagań in Poland).

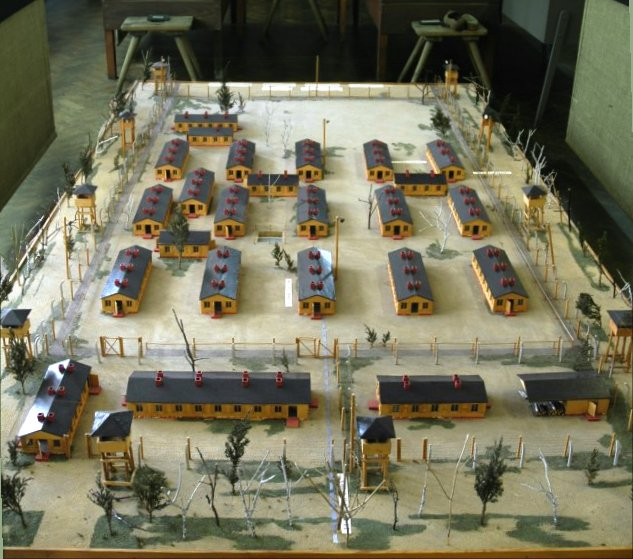
Model of Stalag Luft III prison camp.

Hut 120 was central to the escape committee in Stalag Luft III, it was inhabited by Alex Cassie, Tim Walenn, Gordon Brettell, Des Plunkett and Tony Hayter, three forgers and two mapmakers. Hayter and Ian Cross made serious attempts to learn conversational German while in captivity, their teacher most probably Romualdas Marcinkus. In his experimentation with different methods of producing many hundreds and maybe thousands of maps for the would be escapers Hayter developed a five colour map printing system.

== 'Great Escape' ==
He was one of the 76 men who escaped the prison camp on the night of 24–25 March 1944 in the escape now famous as "the Great Escape". Hayter's plan was to travel by train and head for Mulhouse on the French border, he wore a dark civilian suit and spoke good German. He was posing as a Danish businessman and like Dennis Herbert Cochran hoped to cross the Swiss frontier either from France or Germany, he stopped two days in Mulhouse and on 4 April 1944 started to head south for Basel but just miles short he was stopped at Zillesheim where inspection of his papers revealed minor flaws and he was arrested and taken to Mulhouse. Ending up in Strasbourg police headquarters he was taken away by car heading for Sagan only to be shot beside the road 1 mile from Natzweiler concentration camp and cremated there.

Hayter was one of the 50 escapers executed and murdered by the Gestapo. He was cremated at Natzweiler, but the urn returned to the prisoner of war camp was unusual in that it had no name, date or place of cremation marked on it. Originally his remains were buried at Sagan, he is now buried in part of the Poznan Old Garrison Cemetery.

Memorial to "The Fifty" down the road toward Żagań (Hayter is on the left)

Hayter's name was amongst those in the list of the murdered prisoners which was published in the press in the UK and Commonwealth countries when news broke on or about 20 May 1944.

He is commemorated by name on the Burghclere War Memorial, and at Dunsfold.

== Awards ==
Hayter was mentioned in despatches twice; the first was on 31 December 1940, for his services in connection with the Battle of France while the second was for his conspicuous gallantry as a prisoner of war (none of the other relevant decorations then available could be awarded posthumously). It was published in a supplement to the London Gazette on 8 June 1944.

== Other victims ==
See Stalag Luft III murders

The Gestapo executed a group of 50 of the recaptured prisoners representing almost all of the nationalities involved in the escape. Post-war investigations saw a number of those guilty of the murders tracked down, arrested and tried for their crimes.

Nationalities of the 50 executed
(United Kingdom) 21 British
(Canada) 6 Canadian
(Poland) 6 Polish
(Australia) 5 Australian
(South Africa) 3 South African
(New Zealand) 2 New Zealanders
(Norway) 2 Norwegian
(Belgium) 1 Belgian
(Czechoslovakia) 1 Czechoslovak
(France) 1 Frenchman
(Greece) 1 Greek
(Lithuania) 1 Lithuanian
