= Bernard Green (British Army officer) =

British soldier

- Green (WWI photo)
- Born: Bernard Green; 23 December 1887; Oxfordshire
- Died: 2 November 1971 (aged 83); Chichester
- Spouse: 2 children
- Military career
- Allegiance: United Kingdom
- RAF: Royal Air Force
- Service years: 1915–1945
- Rank: Flight Lieutenant
- Nickname: Pop
- Conflict: Ploegsteert Wood *Battle of Somme *Battle of Passchendaele *The Great Escape
- Awards: *George V Military Cross 1914–1915; War Medal 1914–1920; Victory Medal 1919; 1929–1945 Air Crew Europe Star; War Medal 1939–1945
- Other work: Paper mill worker

Bernard Green (23 December 1887 – 2 November 1971) also known as Pop, was a British soldier who fought in World War I and World War II. In World War I Green fought in two of the bloodiest battles, the Battle of Somme and the Battle of Passchendaele, and was wounded twice. Green was already 52 when he signed up to fight in the Second World War and his escape from a Stalag Luft III was immortalized in the Hollywood movie The Great Escape. Because of his age at the onset of the Second World War, the troops affectionately called him "Pop".

== Military service ==
Green was in the Territorial Army when the First World War began. He was sent to Oxfordshire and was part of the light infantry. In 1915 he was shipped to France and at Ploegsteert Wood he was wounded by shrapnel in the groin. He was then sent to the Machine Gun Corps in 1916, he then fought in the Battle of Somme and Passchendaele. In October 1918, just one month before the Armistice, he was wounded again and sent home.

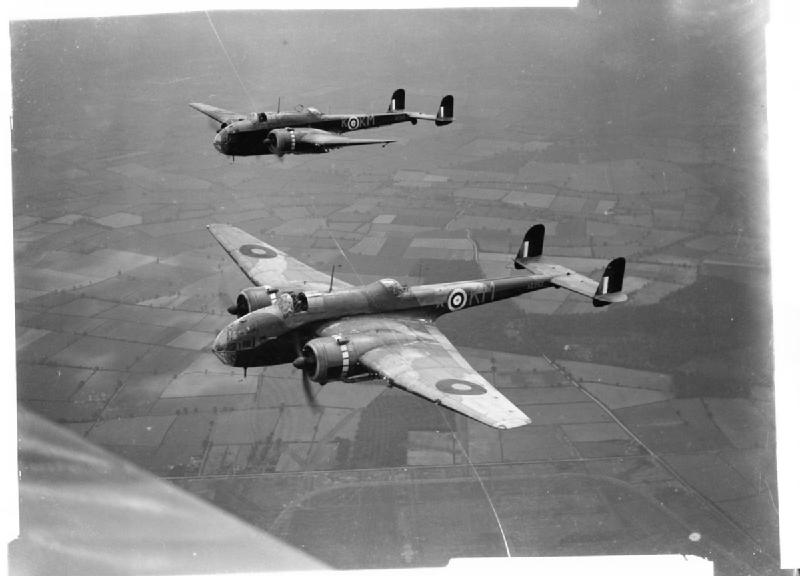
Hampden bomber of the RAF

In World War II Green enlisted in the RAF at the rank of Flight Lieutenant. He was 52 years old when he signed up with the RAF's Bomber Command: he was shot down on his first mission over Denmark in July 1940. Green was operating the rear gunner position flying with the 44 Squadron. In the early hours of 20 July 1940 the plane was hit by flak.

The Hampden bomber went down in the sea.

== The Great Escape ==
Green participated in the Great Escape. The orchestrators were British officers. The prisoners escaped Stalag Luft III by methodically digging a tunnel. Of the 76 who escaped, 3 men got away, 50 were executed, and of the officers remaining the majority were returned to Stalag Luft III whilst some were taken to other places, like Sachsenhausen. Green was among those who were captured and sent back to Stalag Luft III.

== Honours and awards ==
- Military Cross (George V, 1914–1915).
- War Medal 1914–1920.
- Victory Medal 1919.
- Air Crew Europe Star.
- War Medal 1939–1945.

== Personal life ==
He was married in 1916. He and his wife had a boy in 1919 and a girl in 1921. After the first World War he was a paper mill worker in Buckinghamshire.

== Book about Green ==
In 2012 Bernard Green's grandson Lawrence Green wrote a book about his life titled Great War to Great Escape: The Two Wars of Flight Lieutenant Bernard 'Pop' Green MC.
