= Włodzimierz Kolanowski =

Polish officer (1913–1944)

- Born: Włodzimierz Adam Kolanowski; 11 August 1913; Pawłowice, Leszno County, Poland
- Died: 31 March 1944 (aged 30); Jelenia Gora formerly Hirschberg
- Burial place: Poznan Old Garrison Cemetery, Poland
- Military career
- Allegiance: Poland
- Branch: Polish Air Force
- Service years: 1934–1944
- Rank: Flying Officer and Porucznik
- Service number: P.0243
- Unit: No. 301 Polish Bomber Squadron
- Conflicts: World War II: Invasion of Poland; Channel Front (POW)
- Awards: Mentioned in Despatches

Włodzimierz Adam Kolanowski (11 August 1913 – 31 March 1944) was a Polish Vickers Wellington bomber "Observer and Captain" flying from England when he was taken prisoner during the Second World War. He took part in the 'Great Escape' from the Stalag Luft III prisoner of war camp in March 1944 and was one of the men recaptured and subsequently shot by the Gestapo.

== Early life ==
Kolanowski was born in Pawłowice, Leszno County, Poland only about 60 miles from Stalag Luft III where his father worked as a cook in the palace of Count Christopher Mielżyński. He moved with his family to Psarskie near Śrem, where his father worked as an estate official. He enlisted in the Polish Army in September 1934 and rose quickly through the ranks being commissioned into the 66th Infantry Regiment in October 1937. Slightly more than twelve months later he transferred to the Polish Air Force and trained as an "Air Observer" at Dęblin with specialization in aerial surveying and cartography. In August 1939 he joined No. 222 Squadron stationed in Biała Podlaska.

== War service ==
After the fall of Poland under the German and Soviet invasions of September 1939 Kolanowski's unit crossed into Romania where they were briefly interned before being allowed to cross into Yugoslavia and then Greece in a journey to France where the French Air Force was accepting Polish airmen and forming volunteer squadrons in Marseille. He enlisted there on 13 November 1939 and was assigned to "No. 11 Squadron" Polish Air Force in France, but the unit had no aircraft. When France fell he travelled to England on 30 June 1940 and volunteered to fly operationally. He was assessed, re-trained, briefly served as an instructor and as a flying officer in the Free Polish Air Force joined No. 301 Polish Bomber Squadron flying Vickers Wellington bombers from RAF Hemswell. He was an "Observer" (the aircrew role of Navigator /Bomb Aimer) and in command of the aircraft and its crew.

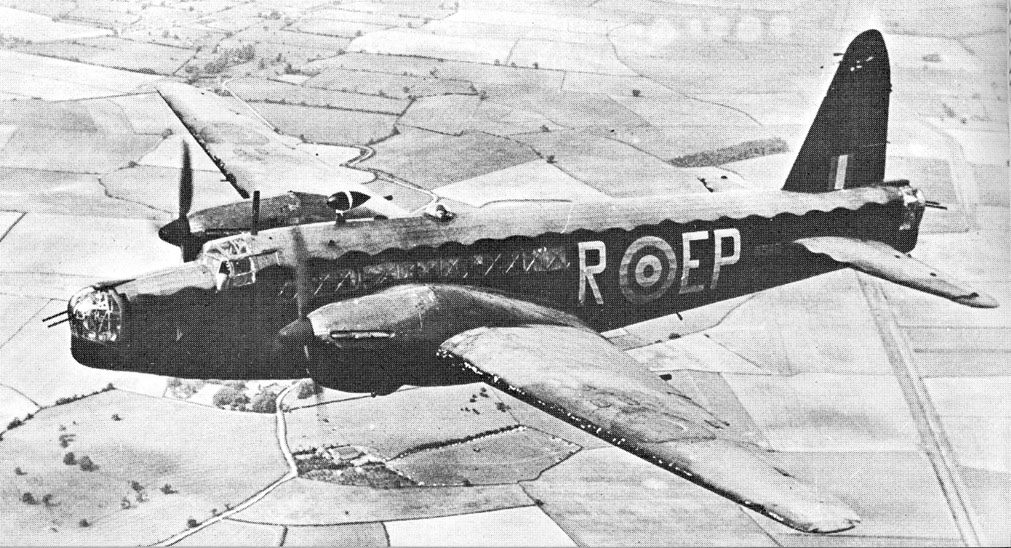
The Merlin-engined Wellington Mark II. Aircraft pictures is of the No. 104 Sqn.

== Prisoner of war ==
Kolanowski was in command of Vickers Wellington Mark IV (squadron codes GR-Z, serial number "Z1277") on the night 7–8 November 1941 attacking the German city of Mannheim. His aircraft was flown by Sergeant Bolcewicz and it took off at 18:47 hours GMT. The bomber received anti-aircraft flak damage and had to land near Maldegem, Belgium where its entire crew were made prisoners of war. Kolanowski went straight into the prison camp system.

He ended up as Prisoner No. 678 in prisoner of war camp Stalag Luft III in the province of Lower Silesia near the town of Sagan (now Żagań in Poland). In prison camp he was regarded as an extremely important member of the escape group, not only as he had grown up only 60 miles away but also as he was experienced in surveying techniques for map making. He worked with Des Plunkett and Tony Hayter to produce multi-coloured maps of the areas relevant to escaping airmen.

== 'Great Escape' ==
Kolanowski was one of the 76 men who escaped the prison camp on the night of 24–25 March 1944 in the escape now famous as "the Great Escape". The initial groups out of the tunnel were those who needed a head start in order to get to the local railway station and catch their appropriate trains. Kolanowski was delayed and unable to catch the train as planned, so he joined a group of English escapees to walk towards Czechoslovakia.

Memorial to "The Fifty" down the road toward Żagań (Kolanowski at right)

In the freezing night air he made the best progress possible and hid in woods about twenty miles from the camp during daytime then proceeding through two villages until captured by the German auxiliary police of Hitler Youth on 28 or 29 March.

He was delivered to Görlitz prison to join Jack Grisman, Ian Cross, Sandy Gunn, Al Hake and others in the cells. During interrogation he was almost certainly one of the men warned that he would be shot.

At Görlitz prison on the morning of 31 March 1944 Keith Ogilvie saw Adam Kolanowski, Edgar Humphreys, Dutchy Swain, Chaz Hall, Brian Evans, Wally Valenta, George McGill, Pat Langford, Bob Stewart and "Hank" Henry Birkland being led away to a covered truck, They were all shot in a clearing off the Görlitz to Sagan road just outside Görlitz and cremated at Liegnitz by the Gestapo.

Kolanowski was one of the 50 escapees executed and murdered selected and listed by SS-Gruppenfuhrer Arthur Nebe to be killed, by the Gestapo. Originally his remains were buried at Sagan, he is now buried in part of the Poznan Old Garrison Cemetery, in Park Cytadela. His name was amongst those in the list of the murdered prisoners which was published in the press in the UK and Commonwealth countries when news broke on or about 20 May 1944. Kolanowski is commemorated on the Polish Air Force Memorial at Northolt, Middlesex. He is also commemorated on the Dunsfold War Memorial website.

Nationalities of the 50 executed
(United Kingdom) 21 British
(Canada) 6 Canadian
(Poland) 6 Polish
(Australia) 5 Australian
(South Africa) 3 South African
(New Zealand) 2 New Zealanders
(Norway) 2 Norwegian
(Belgium) 1 Belgian
(Czechoslovakia) 1 Czechoslovak
(France) 1 Frenchman
(Greece) 1 Greek
(Lithuania) 1 Lithuanian

== Awards ==
His conspicuous bravery as a prisoner was recognized by a Mention in Despatches as none of the other relevant decorations then available could be awarded posthumously.

== Other victims ==
The Gestapo executed a group of 50 of the recaptured prisoners representing almost all of the nationalities involved in the escape. Post-war investigations saw a number of those guilty of the murders tracked down, arrested and tried for their crimes.
