= Wally Floody =

Royal Canadian Air Force officer

- Born: April 28, 1918; Chatham-Kent, Ontario, Canada
- Died: September 25, 1989 (aged 71)
- Military career
- Allegiance: Canada
- Branch: Royal Canadian Air Force
- Service years: 1940–1945
- Rank: Flight Lieutenant
- Unit: No. 401 Squadron RCAF
- Conflicts: Second World War
- Awards: Member of the Order of the British Empire
- Other work: Businessman

Clarke Wallace Chant Floody, MBE (April 28, 1918 – September 25, 1989) was a Canadian fighter pilot and prisoner of war in the Second World War. He was instrumental in organizing and implementing the "Great Escape" from the German prisoner of war camp Stalag Luft III.

== Early life ==
Floody was born in Chatham, Ontario, and attended Northern Vocational School. In 1936 he headed north to work at the Preston East Dome Mines in Timmins, Ontario, as a mucker—shoveling the rock and mud into carts to be hauled up to the surface.

At the onset of the Second World War, Floody was working on a ranch in Alberta when he decided to return home to enlist in the Royal Canadian Air Force (RCAF). He financed his trip back east by shovelling coal into the boiler of the locomotive for the entire trip back to Toronto. After learning that the RCAF was not quite ready for the huge influx of personnel, Floody and Betty married on May 24, 1940, and moved to Kirkland Lake, where Floody could go back to work in the mines.

== Second World War ==
In 1940, Floody and his wife were back in Toronto visiting family. Anxious to find out what was happening to his enlistment application, Floody checked with the recruiting office only to find his application was at the bottom of the pile. The reason: he was now married. After convincing the recruiting officer that "My wife backs me in this 100%", he was advised that the train was leaving for the BCATP air station in Brandon, Manitoba that evening. After a quick goodbye to his family Floody was on his way to becoming an operational pilot and flying with No. 401 Squadron.

Operating from RAF Biggin Hill in England, his Spitfire was shot down on 27 October 1941 over Saint-Omer, France, where he was met by two German soldiers. He was imprisoned at the prisoner of war camp Stalag Luft III at Sagan (now Żagań, Poland). There, he joined the "X-Organization", headed by Roger Bushell (codenamed "Big-X"), who put Floody in charge of digging tunnels and their camouflage, for the upcoming escape attempts by Commonwealth and European prisoners.

However, in March 1944, the German guards, always suspicious of escapes, caught the telltale sign of sand being dropped by one of the 'penguins' out of the bottom of his pant legs and immediately rounded up Floody and 19 others and transferred them to another camp in Belaria.

The escape of 76 men went ahead on the moonless night of March 24, 1944. Eventually the Germans caught all but three prisoners, and to make an example of them to all the other prisoners, Hitler ordered the execution of 50 of the recaptured Allied officers under the pretext that they were shot while attempting escape. At the end of the war Floody gave evidence about conditions in prisoner of war camps at the Nuremberg trials.

On September 22, 1946, two days after Betty's and Floody's first son Brian was born, they received news that Floody had been made a Member of the Order of the British Empire by King George VI; the citation reading, in part:

Flight Lieutenant (F/L) Floody made a thorough study of tunnelling work and devised many different methods & techniques. He became one of the leading organizers and indefatigable workers in the tunnels themselves. Besides being arduous, his work was frequently dangerous....F/L Floody was buried under heavy falls of sand.....but, despite all dangers and difficulties, F/L Floody persisted, showing a marked degree of courage and devotion to duty.

== Later life ==
Returning to civilian life, Floody became a businessman and co-founder of the Royal Canadian Air Force Prisoners of War Association. He died on September 25, 1989. He is buried in Park Lawn Cemetery.

== Feature film involvement ==
Steve McQueen with Floody, while Floody was a technical advisor in production of the film The Great Escape.

In early 1962, Floody received a phone call from director John Sturges. He told Floody he was planning to make a film based on the book by Paul Brickhill, an Australian flyer and writer who, like Floody, had spent time at Stalag Luft III. After Sturges's assurance that the film was to be as accurate as theatrically possible but true to the efforts of those prisoners and the atmosphere of the camps, Floody agreed to be technical adviser on the 1963 feature film The Great Escape which was filmed on locations in Germany during the summer of 1962. He is popularly considered the real-life counterpart to that film's fictional "Tunnel King", Danny Velinski, played by Charles Bronson.
