= Edgar Humphreys =

British bomber pilot (1914–1944)

Edgar Spottiswoode Humphreys
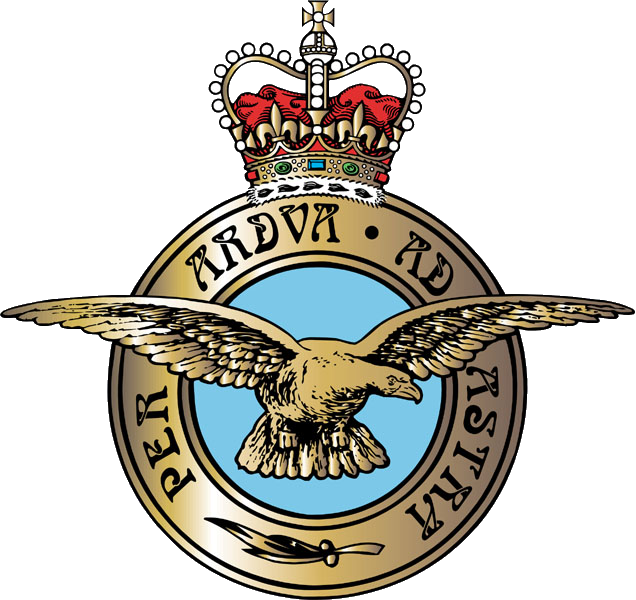
- Born: Edgar Spottiswoode Humphreys; 5 December 1914; Exmouth, Devon
- Died: 31 March 1944 (aged 29) beside the Görlitz to Sagan road
- Burial place: Poznan Old Garrison Cemetery, Poland
- Relatives: Lilian Humphreys (nee Watt) (later Phillips)
- Military career
- Allegiance: United Kingdom
- Branch: Royal Air Force
- Service years: 1932–1944
- Rank: Flight Lieutenant
- Nickname: Hunk
- Service number: 565906 and 44177
- Unit: No. 107 Squadron RAF
- Conflicts: World War II: Channel Front (POW)
- Awards: Mentioned in Despatches

Edgar Spottiswoode Humphreys (5 December 1914 – 31 March 1944), known as "Hunk", was a British Bristol Blenheim bomber pilot who was taken prisoner during the Second World War. He took part in the 'Great Escape' from Stalag Luft III in March 1944, but was re-captured and subsequently shot by the Gestapo.

== Pre-war life ==
Humphreys was born in Exmouth in Devon, the eldest son of Lydia and William Spottiswoode Humphreys. He was educated in the local council school where he enjoyed sports and developed an interest in aircraft. In 1931, at the age of sixteen-and-a-half, he passed the flying tests for the Class A Pilot's Licence, which could not be issued until he reached the age of seventeen. He was then the youngest pilot in Europe. He enlisted in the Royal Air Force in 1932 to train in the 25th Entry of Apprentices at No. 1 School of Technical Training RAF, RAF Halton and graduated in 1935 as an aircraftman 2nd class (service number 565906). Having worked as ground crew servicing the aircraft Humphreys applied for flight training and was accepted to train as a pilot and promoted sergeant after gaining his pilot's wings.

== War service ==
Humphreys was serving as a sergeant pilot when he was commissioned as pilot officer on 19 July 1940 (with seniority from 25 April 1940). He married Lilian Watt in the early summer of 1940 near Okehampton in Devon and they set up home in Boscombe.

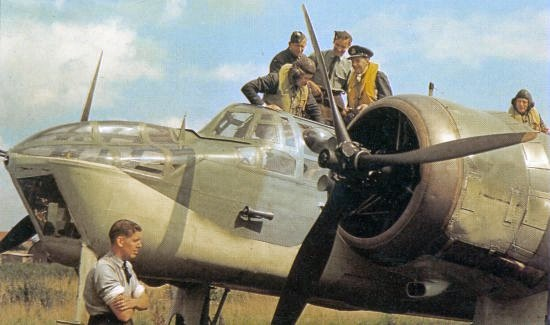
caption= Blenheim Mark IV of 21 Squadron at Bodney in August 1941

Flying Bristol Blenheim light bombers, he served with No. 107 Squadron RAF, flying from RAF Wattisham after their return from France where they had suffered a terrible casualty rate during the Battle of France. The squadron primarily flew precision daylight or nighttime bombing raids on German targets in the occupied countries: airfields, harbours and troop installations. On the evening of 15–16 November 1940, he was fortunate to survive when his Blenheim Mark IV (serial number "R3737") crashed as he attempted an emergency landing near Stowmarket during a mission to bomb German airbases in Europe.

== Prisoner of war ==
On the evening of 19 December 1940, Humphreys took off from RAF Wattisham on a night attack against a German Luftwaffe airfield at Lannion in Brittany, he was flying a Blenheim Mark IV (serial number "T1860) with his crew, Sergeants G R Griggs and L F Brand. The aircraft was lost, possibly due to naval light anti-aircraft fire, on this mission and its crew taken prisoner. Humphreys was allocated Prisoner of War No. 406 and held at Stalag Luft I at Barth. On 19 July 1941 he was promoted to flying officer, and exactly one year later he was promoted again, to flight lieutenant.

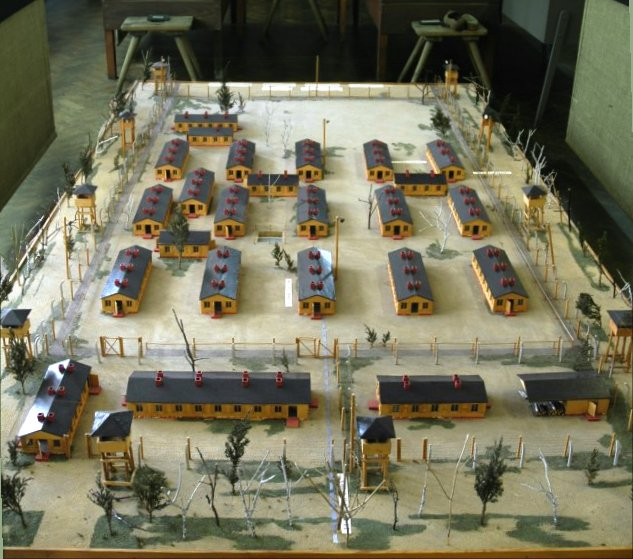
Model of Stalag Luft III prison camp.

At Stalag Luft I Humphreys met Roger Bushell during various tunnelling escape attempts. Bushell later masterminded the 'Great Escape'. Humphreys, Jack Grisman, Leslie George Bull and several other prisoners were part of the group with Bushell who were sent to Stalag Luft III in the province of Lower Silesia near the town of Sagan (now Żagań in Poland).

== 'Great Escape' ==
Allocated no. 54 in the queue of officers escaping through the tunnel, Humphreys teamed up with no. 55, Paul Royle, for no better reason than "he was next in the queue". He was one of the 76 men who escaped the prison camp on the night of 24–25 March 1944 in the escape now famous as "the Great Escape". He followed Denys Street out of the tunnel at about 0230 hours and into the woods with Royle, where their group swelled to ten before their appointed marshal "Hank" Henry Birkland led his group off westwards.

Humphreys and Royle headed off southwards when the group split and struggled through the thick snow and biting cold. They dodged four civilians but were arrested near the village of Tiefenfurt by a group of German Home Guard(sic) within 24 hours just sixteen miles to the south of the camp at about 0300 on the morning of 26 March 1944, they were locked up in the local prison. Fellow escaper Shorty Anderson arrived next and then Johnny Marshall and Willy Valenta. The four were driven to Sagan police station the next morning where Bill Cameron was brought in. Shortly afterwards Keith Ogilvie, Tommy Thompson, Brian Evans and Chaz Hall joined them. More and more recaptured airmen arrived at Sagan civil jail until they were moved by truck, to be held at Görlitz prison where eventually the total reached 35.

At Görlitz prison on the morning of 31 March 1944, Keith Ogilvie saw Humphreys, Dutchy Swain, Chaz Hall, Brian Evans, Wally Valenta, George McGill, Pat Langford, Adam Kolanowski, Bob Stewart and Birkland being led away to a covered truck, They were all shot in a clearing off the Görlitz to Sagan road just outside Görlitz and cremated at Liegnitz by the Gestapo.

Memorial to "The Fifty" down the road toward Żagań (Humphreys is on the right)

Humphreys was one of the 50 escapees executed and murdered by the Gestapo. Originally his remains were buried at Sagan, he is now buried in part of the Poznan Old Garrison Cemetery. (Post-war investigations led to a number of those guilty of the murders tracked down, arrested and tried for their crimes.) Humphreys' name was amongst those in the list of the murdered prisoners which was published in the press in the UK and Commonwealth countries when news broke on or about 20 May 1944.

As a 'Halton brat' or 'old Haltonian', a graduate of the RAF Halton aircraft apprentice scheme, he is commemorated by name in the stained glass window in St. George's Church, RAF Halton dedicated to those murdered following the 'Great Escape'. He is also commemorated on the Dunsfold War Memorial website. (His name is apparently misspelled on the memorial as "Humphries".)

== Awards ==
He was mentioned in despatches for conspicuous gallantry as a prisoner of war (none of the other relevant decorations then available could be awarded posthumously). It was published in a supplement to the London Gazette on 8 June 1944.
