= Henry Birkland =

Canadian fighter pilot (1917–1944)

- Born: Henry Birkland; 16 August 1917; Caldwell, Manitoba
- Died: 31 March 1944 (aged 26) near Sagan, Nazi Germany
- Burial place: Poznan Old Garrison Cemetery, Poland
- Military career
- Allegiance: Canada
- Branch: Royal Canadian Air Force
- Service years: 1940–1944
- Rank: Flight lieutenant
- Nickname: Hank
- Service number: J5233
- Unit: No. 72 Squadron RAF
- Conflicts: World War II: Channel Front (POW)
- Awards: Mentioned in Despatches

Henry Birkland (16 August 1917 – 31 March 1944), was a Canadian Spitfire pilot who was taken prisoner during the Second World War. He took part in the 'Great Escape' from Stalag Luft III in March 1944, but was one of the men re-captured and murdered by the Gestapo.

== Early life ==
Birkland was born in Caldwell, Manitoba, Canada and educated in Calgary. He worked as a packer for the Burns Co. in 1937–38, as a truck driver for a gas company in the middle of 1938, briefly as a dishwasher and then a gold miner at Gold Belt mining company in British Columbia for the year until May 1940.

== War service ==
Birkland enlisted in the Royal Canadian Air Force in July 1940 as an aircrew candidate. Following basic training Birkland was promoted to leading aircraftman and posted for flying training to No.11 Elementary Flying Training School RCAF. Graduating in January 1941 he transferred to No.9 Service Flying Training School. As a fully qualified pilot he was promoted sergeant on 26 April 1941. Birkland was commissioned as a pilot officer with effect from 27 April 1941 and sailed to Great Britain to fly operationally with RAF Fighter Command. After six weeks with No.57 Operational Training Unit Birkland joined No. 122 Squadron RAF Fighter Command on 11 August 1941 flying Spitfire aircraft before transferring to No. 72 Squadron RAF on 19 September 1941 where he also flew Spitfires.

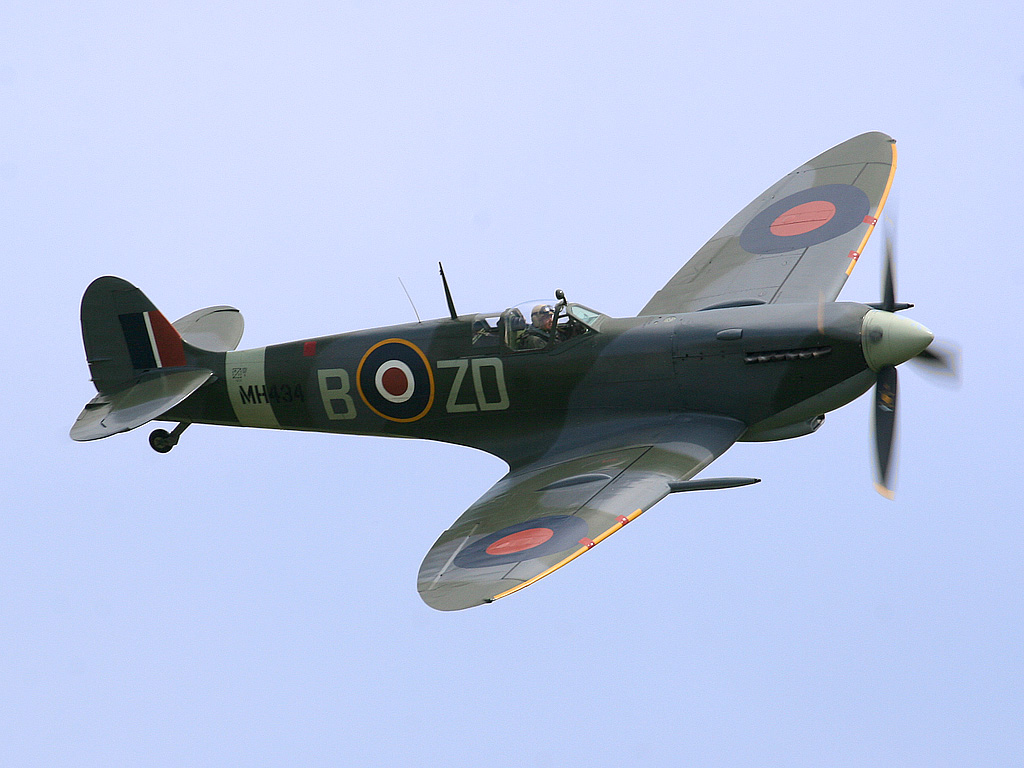
Spitfire fighter

== Prisoner of war ==
Flying operationally with No.72 Squadron, Birkland was pilot of Spitfire Mark Vb serial W3367 on the afternoon of 7 November 1941 on a Rodeo mission over the coast of occupied Europe. Birkland was shot down by Uffz. Heinz Richter from Stab/JG 26, who later claimed a Spitfire 2 kilometers north of Étaples at 15:10 hours. Birkland was captured, becoming a prisoner of war. Following interrogation, he was sent to Stalag Luft I as Prisoner of War Number 689 and later to Stalag Luft III in the province of Lower Silesia near the town of Sagan (now Żagań in Poland). He had been a member of an earlier unsuccessful attempt to mass escape from the camp in June 1943.

== The 'Great Escape' ==
For the Great Escape operation Birkland, an experienced former miner, became one of the leading and most energetic of the six hundred officers involved in tunnelling. He was regarded as "the toughest tunneller of them all". In the escape plan his group of escapers were known as "the hard arsers" for their plan to avoid public transport and travel on foot a considerable distance across country.

He was one of the 76 men who escaped the prison camp on the night of 24–25 March 1944, in the escape now famous as "the Great Escape". His group did not make a great distance before the alert was raised and the German authorities began a major man-hunt. Birkland was amongst the officers recaptured relatively locally who were taken to Görlitz prison 36 miles south from Sagan. George McGill (RCAF officer), Henry Birkland, Pat Langford, Mike Casey, George Wiley, Tom Leigh, John Pohe, Cyril Swain, Charles Hall, Brian Evans, Wlodzimierz Kolanowski and Bob Stewart were taken away in black cars by plain clothes Gestapo officials on 30 and 31 March 1944 and were never seen alive again. Another account states that on 31 March 1944 a group of 10 officers including Birkland were taken away. The plates on their cremation urns showed that they had been cremated at Liegnitz (now Legnica), 55 miles to the east of Sagan, but no dates were given. So he became one of the 50 executed and murdered by the Gestapo. His remains, which were originally buried at Sagan, were moved in November 1948 to the Poznan Old Garrison Cemetery to lie beside those of his fellow escapers. Birkland's headstone has the inscription chosen by his parents "Beloved, by family and friends alike, he gave his life, knowing this right".

Birkland's name was amongst those in the list of the murdered prisoners which was published when news broke on or about 20 May 1944.

Memorial to "The Fifty" down the road toward Żagań (Birkland is the first name on the left)

== Awards ==
His conspicuous bravery was recognized by a mention in despatches as none of the other relevant decorations then available could be awarded posthumously. It was published in a supplement to the London Gazette on 8 June 1944.

== Other victims ==
See Stalag Luft III murders

The Gestapo executed a group of 50 of the recaptured prisoners representing almost all of the nationalities involved in the escape. Post-war investigations saw a number of those guilty of the murders tracked down, arrested and tried for their crimes.

Nationalities of the 50 executed
(United Kingdom) 21 British
(Canada) 6 Canadian
(Poland) 6 Polish
(Australia) 5 Australian
(South Africa) 3 South African
(New Zealand) 2 New Zealanders
(Norway) 2 Norwegian
(Belgium) 1 Belgian
(Czechoslovakia) 1 Czechoslovak
(France) 1 Frenchman
(Greece) 1 Greek
(Lithuania) 1 Lithuanian
