= Natzwiller =

- Commune
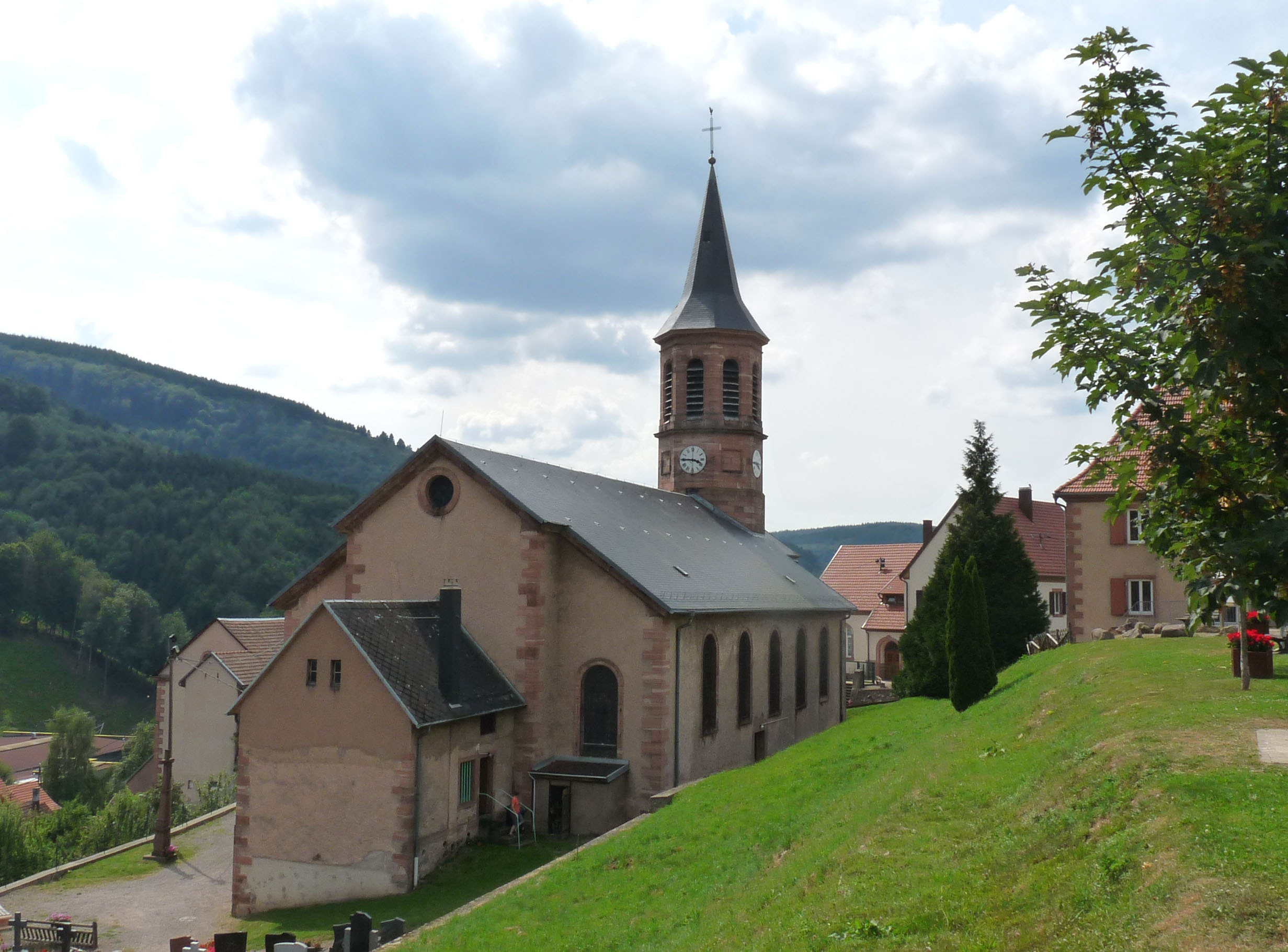
- The church in Natzwiller

- Coat of arms
- Location of Natzwiller
- Location within France Location within Grand Est
- Coordinates: 48°26′19″N 7°15′15″E
- Country: France
- Region: Grand Est
- Department: Bas-Rhin
- Arrondissement: Molsheim
- Canton: Mutzig

Government
  - Mayor (2020–2026): André Woock
- Area^{1}: 7.29 km^{2} (2.81 sq mi)
- Highest elevation: 1,013 m (3,323 ft)
- Lowest elevation: 379 m (1,243 ft)
- Population (2023): 521
  - Density: 71.5/km^{2} (185/sq mi)
- Time zone: UTC+01:00 (CET)
  - Summer (DST): UTC+02:00 (CEST)
- INSEE/Postal code: 67314 /67130
- ^{1} French Land Register data, which excludes lakes, ponds, glaciers > 1 km^{2} (0.386 sq mi or 247 acres) and river estuaries.

Natzwiller (French pronunciation: [natsvilɛʁ]; German: Natzweiler) is a commune in the Bas-Rhin department in Grand Est in northeastern France.

== History ==
Built in spring 1941 on the territory of the commune, Natzweiler-Struthof concentration camp opened for prisoners in May 1941. It was the only Nazi concentration camp on French soil. The inmates originally were German who were to supply labor for building V-2 rocket factories in man-made caves dug out of the Vosges Mountains.

The prisoners lived in the cold, damp tunnels as they built them. The camp was expanded by the Nazis with the installation of a gas chamber in April 1943 and crematorium. Its main function was temporary detention of Resistance fighters from overrun European nations, although some Nazi experiments on Jews were carried out at the camp.

== Museum ==
The camp site has been preserved as a museum and includes a monument to the departed.

== See also ==
- Communes of the Bas-Rhin department
