= Dennis Cochran =

Royal Air Force officer

Dennis Herbert Cochran
- Born: Dennis Herbert Cochran; 13 August 1921; Hackney, London
- Died: 31 March 1944 (aged 22); Natzweiler-Struthof
- Burial place: Poznan Old Garrison Cemetery, Poland
- Military career
- Allegiance: United Kingdom
- Branch: Royal Air Force
- Service years: 1941–44
- Rank: Flying Officer
- Service number: 1287613 and 122441
- Unit: No. 10 Operational Training Unit RAF
- Conflicts: World War II: Channel Front (POW)
- Awards: Mentioned in Despatches

Dennis Herbert Cochran (13 August 1921 – 31 March 1944), was an officer in the Royal Air Force and member of a British Armstrong Whitworth Whitley bomber crew who was shot down and taken prisoner during the Second World War. Notable for his part in the 'Great Escape' from Stalag Luft III in March 1944 when he almost reached Switzerland but was one of the men recaptured and murdered by the Gestapo.

== War service ==
Cochran was born in Hackney, London the son of Ethel Grace and Herbert William Cochran a postal worker and former soldier. It is noted that some sources state that he was born in Clapton, London. He was well known as a premier league table tennis player in the London region when he enlisted in the Royal Air Force in 1941 as an aircrew candidate with the service number 1287613. Cochran completed basic training and commenced specialised training in the dual trades of wireless operator and air gunner. Following the award of his aircrew brevet he was commissioned as pilot officer with service number 122441 and posted to No. 10 Operational Training Unit a squadron flying Armstrong Whitworth Whitley bombers on anti-submarine patrols from RAF St Eval while completing the operational training of its men ready for missions with RAF Bomber Command.

== Prisoner of war ==
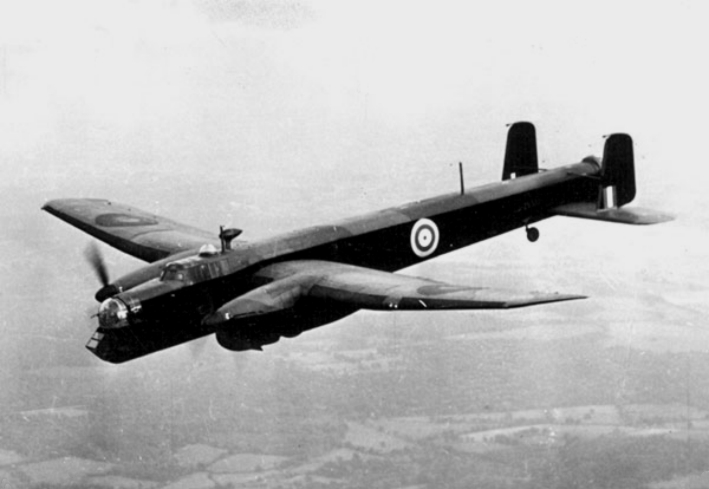
Whitley bomber.

Flying operationally with No.10 Operational Training Unit aboard Armstrong Whitworth Whitley Mark V (serial number "AD671"), Cochran was a member of the crew of Sergeant C N Ellis when they took off from RAF St Eval on 8 October 1942 on a mission to hunt u-boats making passage in the Bay of Biscay between their home ports and the North Atlantic convoy routes. Their Whitley was intercepted by a German long-range maritime patrol aircraft Junkers Ju 88 flown by Leutnant Dieter Meister of 13 Staffel, Kampfgeschwader 40 and shot down into the Bay of Biscay. The British crew survived the attack and made it ashore in France. Cochran immediately went on the run and evaded capture for over a month but was eventually taken prisoner by the Germans on 9 November 1942 based on their own records. Cochran became prisoner of war No. 727 at Stalag Luft III in the province of Lower Silesia near the town of Sagan (now Żagań in Poland). He was a highly enthusiastic tunneller and spoke nearly fluent German having learned the language since a boy. While in captivity he was promoted flying officer He had experience of escaping having been on the run previously after an escape, on that occasion dressed in the uniform of a Luftwaffe private and carrying a skilfully carved wooden replica rifle.

== 'Great Escape' ==
For the Great Escape operation Cochran was one of the primary tunnellers and that factor coupled with his command of the German language gained him the favourable position No.16 in the line of the 200 men hoping to escape through the tunnel. He was one of the 76 men who escaped the prison camp on the night of 24–25 March 1944, in the escape now famous as "the Great Escape".

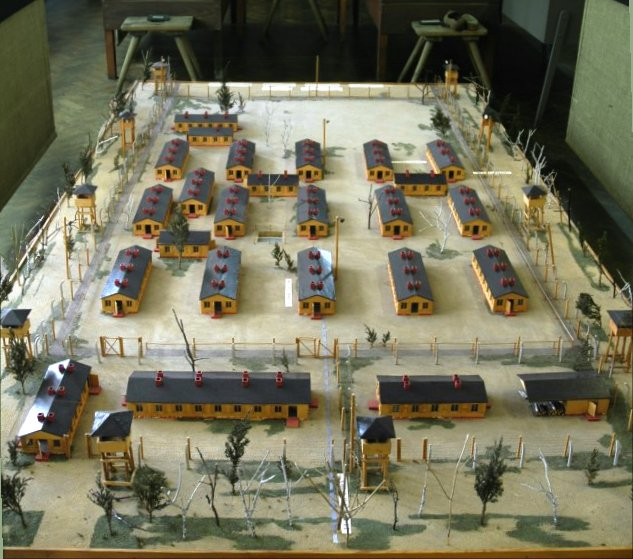
Model of Stalag Luft III prison camp.

When the Germans discovered the escape they began extensive well planned manhunts. Disguised in a uniform stained to resemble those of the displaced persons on forced labour duties all across Germany Cochran was positively sighted sweeping streets in Frankfurt am Main before travelling alone to Freiburg and then south only to be recaptured at Lörrach in distant southern Germany right on top of the French and Swiss frontiers. Literally only needing to cross the river to Basel in neutral Switzerland he was hand-cuffed and taken to a local police station. He was not promptly returned to Luftwaffe custody to be sent back to prison camp as was the established practice but instead he was taken by his captors to Karlsruhe Kriminalpolizei prison under the control of Oberregierungsrat Josef Gmeiner head of the Karlsruhe Gestapo. Gmeiner deputised Krimminalkommissar Walter Herberg to take Cochran out into the countryside and supervise junior ranking Gestapo agents Heinrich Boschert and Otto Preiss who would execute him there with the official story that Cochran was attempting to escape again. The instruction was to take Cochran's body to the nearby Natzweiler-Struthof concentration camp high in the Vosges mountains where he was to be cremated in the camp crematorium. The following morning, 31 March 1944 in a soft-topped official sedan, they collected Cochran but the driver drove directly through Strasbourg to Natzweiler in error and they had to leave the camp and stop in a wooded area nearby supposedly for a break before their journey. Cochran was promptly shot dead and his body taken to the camp for cremation. He was one of the 50 escapers executed and murdered by the Gestapo. Originally cremated at Natzweiler-Struthof then buried at Sagan, he is now buried in part of the Poznan Old Garrison Cemetery.

His name was amongst the 47 murdered officers named in the British press when the story became public knowledge on or about 20 May 1944

Memorial to "The Fifty" down the road toward Żagań (Cochran's name is on the left)

== Awards ==
His conspicuous bravery was recognised by a Mention in Despatches as none of the other relevant decorations then available could be awarded posthumously. It was published in a supplement to the London Gazette on 8 June 1944.

== Other victims ==
See Stalag Luft III murders

The Gestapo executed a group of 50 of the recaptured prisoners representing almost all of the nationalities involved in the escape.

Post-war investigations saw a number of those guilty of the murders tracked down, arrested and tried for their crimes.

Nationalities of the 50 executed
(United Kingdom) 21 British
(Canada) 6 Canadian
(Poland) 6 Polish
(Australia) 5 Australian
(South Africa) 3 South African
(New Zealand) 2 New Zealanders
(Norway) 2 Norwegian
(Belgium) 1 Belgian
(Czechoslovakia) 1 Czechoslovak
(France) 1 Frenchman
(Greece) 1 Greek
(Lithuania) 1 Lithuanian
