= Charles Piers Egerton Hall =

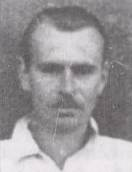
- Charles Piers Hall
- Born: Charles Piers Hall; 25 July 1918; Kings Norton, England
- Died: 31 March 1944 (aged 25); Liegnitz
- Burial place: Poznan, old garrison cemetery, Poland
- Military career
- Allegiance: United Kingdom
- Branch: Royal Air Force
- Service years: 1941–1944
- Rank: Flight Lieutenant
- Nickname: Chaz
- Service number: 50896
- Unit: 1st Photographic Reconnaissance Unit
- Conflicts: World War II: Channel Front (POW)
- Awards: Mentioned in Despatches

Charles Piers Hall (25 July 1918 – 31 March 1944) was a British pilot who was taken prisoner during the Second World War. He was part of the 'Great Escape' from Stalag Luft III in March 1944, but was captured and subsequently shot by the Gestapo.

== War service ==
Hall was born in Kings Norton near Birmingham; He enlisted in the Royal Air Force pre-war as a regular service airman with the service number 550173 on 11 February 1935. He trained to be a photographer in Halton. He was stationed as a photographer at Station Calshot on 18 February 1936, then served as a photographer on HMS Argus from 10 September 1938 and at NAS Eastleigh from 9 June 1939. Hall started his pilot training at 4 ITW at RAF Paignton at 19 August 1940, followed by flight training at No. 9 SFTS at RAF Hullavington from 4 December 1940. Hall was a leading aircraftman at the time he was commissioned as pilot officer on 17 April 1941 for the duration of hostilities. During World War II he served as a flight lieutenant in the Royal Air Force Volunteer Reserve. On 19 November 1941 he became a pilot for the 1st Photographic Reconnaissance Unit (PRU) flying out of RAF Benson South Oxfordshire, England. He flew his first operational photographic reconnaissance mission on 16 December 1941 in Spitfire PR.IV AB120, photographing over IJmuiden, Amsterdam, Zwolle and Hilversum. Hall flew his second operational photographic reconnaissance mission one day later, on 17 December 1941, again in Spitfire PR.IV AB120. His mission was to photograph targets in the area of Kiel, Brunsbüttel and the Frisian Islands. Due to a solid cloud layer at low altitude he was unable to take photographs and when he observed two enemy aircraft approaching from the southeast he started his return home.

== Prisoner of war ==
Hall was flying 1 PRU Spitfire PR.IV AA804 on 28 December 1941 when the aircraft came down over Bergen op Zoom, the Netherlands. He had been on a high-level reconnaissance mission to Düsseldorf and Essen to photograph bombed factories when he was either shot down or suffered engine failure (accounts vary). It was the aircraft's first operational flight and Hall's third operational flight. He became a prisoner of war and was sent to Oflag IX-AH Spangenberg Castle, followed by Stalag Luft III in Germany in the province of Lower Silesia near the town of Sagan (now Żagań in Poland). Hall was promoted flying officer on 17 April 1942. and flight lieutenant on 17 April 1943.

== 'Great Escape' ==
See Stalag Luft III murders

He was one of the 76 men who escaped the prison camp on the night of 24–25 March 1944, in the escape now famous as "the Great Escape". He was recaptured near Sagan. He was one of the 50 executed and murdered by the Gestapo on the personal orders of Adolf Hitler on 31 March 1944. Before his execution he had written on his cell wall "We who are about to die salute you". He was cremated at Liegnitz, now remembered at the Poznan Old Garrison Cemetery.

Memorial to "The Fifty" down the road toward Żagań (Hall is top right)

== Awards ==
His conspicuous bravery was recognized by a mention in Despatches as none of the other relevant decorations then available could be awarded posthumously.
