= Brian Evans (RAF officer) =

British RAF pilot (1920–1944)

Brian Herbert Evans
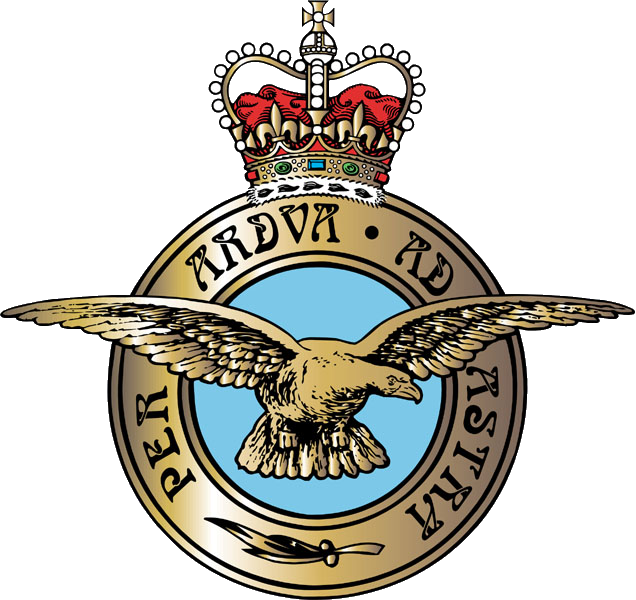
- Born: Brian Herbert Evans; 14 February 1920; Shaldon, Devon
- Died: 31 March 1944 (aged 24) between Görlitz and Sagan
- Burial place: Poznan Old Garrison Cemetery, Poland
- Military career
- Allegiance: United Kingdom
- Branch: Royal Air Force
- Service years: 1939–44
- Rank: Flight Lieutenant
- Service number: 42745
- Unit: No. 49 Squadron RAF
- Conflicts: World War II: Channel Front (POW)
- Awards: Mentioned in Despatches

Brian Herbert Evans (14 February 1920 – 31 March 1944), was a Royal Air Force bomber pilot who was taken prisoner during the Second World War. Notable for his part in the 'Great Escape' from Stalag Luft III in March 1944 he was one of the men recaptured and subsequently murdered by the Gestapo.

== Pre-war life ==
Evans was born in Shaldon, Devon the son of Australian born Dorothy and Captain Herbert Evans (Mercantile Marine) Clan Line steamers. It is noted that German records state that he was born in "Shelton" (sic). The family later moved to Upton near Birkenhead which was near to the port regularly used by Clan Line steamers. In 1933 Alan Cobham’s air circus set up very close to their home and young Brian fell in love with aircraft and flying. In the summer of 1935 the family moved to Cardiff. Although desperate to get into civil aviation Evans struggled with mathematics and it blocked his progress. He left school in 1938 and moved to Liverpool to work in wholesale grocery and then back to Cardiff as an apprentice in a firm of auctioneers and surveyors. He joined Cardiff Aeroplane Club and gained his civil pilots license No. 17016 on 7 February 1939 flying a De Havilland DH.60

== Wartime Service ==
Evans joined the Royal Air Force with effect from 8 August 1939 and was posted to the Civil Flying School at Gatwick. He was granted a short service commission (4 years) as acting pilot officer on 9 October 1939 By April 1940 he was flying with No. 14 Operational Training Unit at RAF Cottesmore making anti-submarine patrols in Avro Anson aircraft and on 4 May 1940 he was confirmed as pilot officer On 30 September 1940 he was posted to No. 49 Squadron RAF at Scampton flying Handley Page Hampdens but was severely wounded on 16 October 1940 by anti-aircraft fire over Bordeaux harbour flying Hampden L4129 on a mine laying mission. Evans managed to get the damaged bomber home and crash landed at Lenham, Kent at 0450 hours; three of the crew survived alive but one died. Returning to operational flying in November, he suffered a second crash.

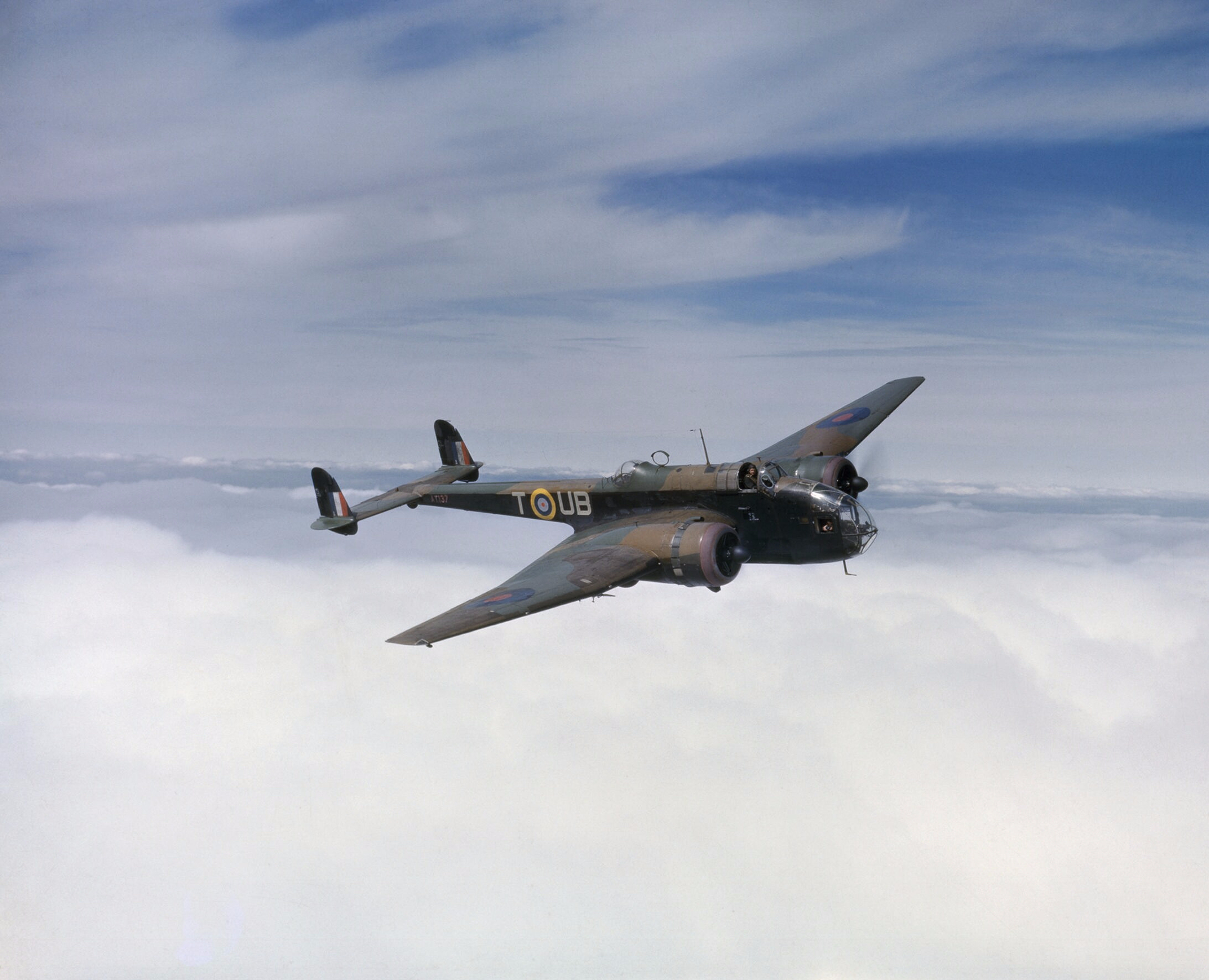
A Hampden in 1942

== Prisoner of war ==
Flying as second pilot with an experienced crew Evans took part in a night attack on German airfields in Northern France on 6 December 1940. Handley Page Hampden serial number P4404 (squadron codes EA-R) received anti-aircraft damaged and then ran into a snowstorm over Paris where both engines iced up and failed, the aircraft had to be crash landed in a field near Courville, Marne where all but one airman was injured. The local farmer agreed to help the crew but then sent a boy to get the Germans. German records show that he was taken prisoner on 7 December 1940 and became prisoner of war number 456. He arrived at prison camp Stalag Luft I Barth where on 4 May 1941 he was promoted flying officer and was later moved to Stalag Luft III in the province of Lower Silesia near the town of Sagan (now Żagań in Poland). On 4 May 1942 Evans was promoted flight lieutenant

== 'Great Escape' ==
For the Great Escape operation Evans was a regular tunneller and earned a favourable early position in the line of the 200 men hoping to escape through the tunnel. He was one of the 76 men who escaped the prison camp on the night of 24–25 March 1944, in the escape now famous as "the Great Escape".

Five days before the Escape, he wrote to his fiancée:

"...I still haven't got over the idea that we're going to spend the rest of our lives together.... I've got a terrific lot to repay to you. If it weren't for your letters I don't know what I'd do.... Remember I'm coming back home to you soon to look after you darling. Until then, remember I'll always love you."

When the Germans discovered the escape they began extensive well planned manhunts which resulted in the recapture of the officers relatively quickly. Evans is reported to have been recaptured near Halbau The recaptured officers were collected at Görlitz prison under Gestapo control. Here their numbers grew until thirty-five were held there. The prisoners were threatened with death and interrogated harshly but not physically. On 30 March 1944 two of the survivors saw three large sedans with ten Gestapo agents collect six officers who were taken away. On the next day ten more recaptured officers were taken away by Gestapo agents, including Evans. These men were not seen alive again.

The bodies of this group were cremated at Liegnitz by the Gestapo. He was one of the 50 escapers executed and murdered by the Gestapo. His ashes originally buried at Sagan, he is now buried in part of the Poznan Old Garrison Cemetery.

His name was amongst the 47 murdered officers named in the British press when the story became public knowledge on or about 19–20 May 1944 The Glasgow Herald of 19 May 1944 published an early list naming several officers including Evans

Memorial to "The Fifty" down the road toward Żagań

== Awards ==
His conspicuous bravery was recognized by a Mention in Despatches as none of the other relevant decorations then available could be awarded posthumously. It was published in a supplement to the London Gazette on 8 June 1944.

== Other victims ==
See Stalag Luft III murders

The Gestapo executed a group of 50 of the recaptured prisoners representing almost all of the nationalities involved in the escape.

Post-war investigations saw a number of those guilty of the murders tracked down, arrested and tried for their crimes.

Nationalities of the 50 executed
(United Kingdom) 21 British
(Canada) 6 Canadian
(Poland) 6 Polish
(Australia) 5 Australian
(South Africa) 3 South African
(New Zealand) 2 New Zealanders
(Norway) 2 Norwegian
(Belgium) 1 Belgian
(Czechoslovakia) 1 Czechoslovak
(France) 1 Frenchman
(Greece) 1 Greek
(Lithuania) 1 Lithuanian
