= Jerzy Mondschein =

Polish military pilot

- Born: Jerzy Tomasz Mondschein; 18 March 1909; Warsaw, Poland
- Died: 29 March 1944 (aged 35) near Jelenia Góra or Liberec
- Burial place: Poznań Old Garrison Cemetery, Poland
- Military career
- Allegiance: Poland
- Branch: Polish Air Force
- Service years: 1935–1944
- Rank: Flying Officer and Porucznik
- Service number: P.0913
- Unit: No. 304 Polish Bomber Squadron
- Conflicts: World War II: Invasion of Poland; Channel Front (POW)
- Awards: Mentioned in Despatches

Jerzy Mondschein (18 March 1909 – 29 March 1944) was a Polish Vickers Wellington bomber Observer (navigator) flying from England when he was taken prisoner during the Second World War. He took part in the 'Great Escape' from Stalag Luft III in March 1944 and was one of the men recaptured and subsequently shot by the Gestapo.

== Early life ==

Mondschein was of German descent from his father's side, so he could speak German fluently, but assimilated into Polish society. He grew up in Warsaw and worked in the building industry before becoming a pre-war regular serviceman with the Polish Air Force. By the time Poland fell to Nazi Germany and the Soviets, he had earned the Polish Cross of Valour with 2 additional award bars. He was a married man with a family.

== War service ==
Logo of 304 Polish Squadron

After the fall of Poland under the German and Soviet invasions of September 1939 he made the journey to France where the French Air Force was accepting Polish airmen and forming volunteer squadrons in Marseille. He enlisted there.

When France fell he travelled to England and volunteered to fly operationally. He was assessed, re-trained, and joined the Free Polish Air Force serving with No. 304 Polish Bomber Squadron flying as Observer (navigator) aboard Vickers Wellington bombers from RAF Lindholme.

== Prisoner of war ==
Mondschein was a member of the crew of Vickers Wellington Mark Ic (serial number “R1215”) on the night of 7–8 November 1941, attacking the German city of Mannheim. His aircraft was flown by Sergeant Blicharz and it took off at 18:03 hours GMT. The bomber did not return and last reported at 20:55 hours stating that they had attacked the target. Its entire crew were made prisoner of war near the Luftwaffe airfield at St. Trond, Belgium. Mondscein went straight into the prison camp system. He ended up as Prisoner No. 680 in prisoner of war camp Stalag Luft III in the province of Lower Silesia near the town of Sagan (now Żagań in Poland).

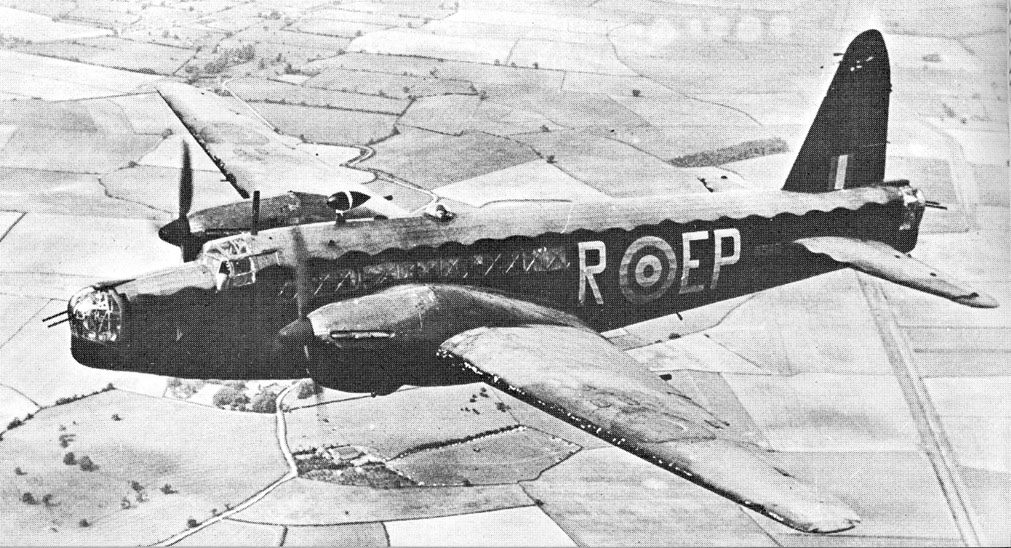
The Merlin-engined Wellington Mark II. This aircraft actually belongs to No. 104 Sqn.

As a prisoner of war Mondschein had several skills that were valuable to the escaping group: he spoke German fluently, he was a skilled tailor who could re-design blankets or British military uniform into passable civilian clothing, he had experience with cutting concrete and could hide cut sections and was a collator of useful information. Mondschein cut out the concrete section to form the access point for tunnel "Dick" in Hut 122 and made a replacement which was undetectable. Housed in Hut 110 he pushed on through bouts of depression when he spent nights unable to sleep and apparently accurately predicted his fate.

== 'Great Escape' ==
Memorial to "The Fifty" down the road toward Żagań (Mondschein at right)

Mondschein was one of the 76 men who escaped the prison camp on the night of 24–25 March 1944 in the escape now famous as "the Great Escape". The initial groups out of the tunnel were those who needed a head start in order to get to the local railway station and catch their appropriate trains. He was in the first group of twelve "walkers" who followed, they were led by Williy Williams and posed as a band of lumber mill workers on leave and included Canadian Jim Wernham and Poles Tony Kiewnarski and Kaz Pawluk. In a filthy cold night they headed east towards the railway lines and then south to Tschiebsdorf railway station where Jerzy Mondschein, who spoke fluent German, used a forged travel pass to buy tickets for the group of twelve on the 6AM train to Boberrohrsdorf three hours south where they split up. Willy Williams and Rusty Kierath headed off and later joined up with Johnny Bull and Jerzy Mondschein to trek through the Reisengebirge mountains where they were arrested by a mountain patrol trying to cross into occupied Czechoslovakia and taken to Reichenberg prison.

The four men were handed over to the Gestapo at 4AM on 29 March 1944 believing that they were to be returned to prison camp by road but near Jelenia Góra then called Hirschberg they were shot. and cremated at Most by the Gestapo. Mondschein was one of the 50 escapers executed and murdered selected and listed by SS-Gruppenfuhrer Arthur Nebe to be killed, by the Gestapo. Originally his remains were buried at Żagań, he is now buried in part of the Poznań Old Garrison Cemetery.

His name was amongst those in the list of the murdered prisoners which was published in the press in the UK and Commonwealth countries when news broke on or about 20 May 1944. Mondschein is commemorated on the Polish Air Force Memorial at Northolt, Middlesex. He is also commemorated on the Dunsfold War Memorial website.

Nationalities of the 50 executed
(United Kingdom) 21 British
(Canada) 6 Canadian
(Poland) 6 Polish
(Australia) 5 Australian
(South Africa) 3 South African
(New Zealand) 2 New Zealanders
(Norway) 2 Norwegian
(Belgium) 1 Belgian
(Czechoslovakia) 1 Czechoslovak
(France) 1 Frenchman
(Greece) 1 Greek
(Lithuania) 1 Lithuanian

== Awards ==
His conspicuous bravery as a prisoner was recognized by a Mention in Despatches as none of the other relevant decorations then available could be awarded posthumously.

On 25 March 2012, the Czech Republic held a ceremony honouring these men and unveiling a plaque in their memory in the city of Most (formerly Brux) where they were murdered. The Czech Air Force organised a fly past and a Guard of Honour at the ceremony, which took place on the 68th anniversary of their escape. Members of the families of the four airmen met for the first time at this event.

== Other victims ==
The Gestapo executed a group of 50 of the recaptured prisoners representing almost all of the nationalities involved in the escape. Post-war investigations saw a number of those guilty of the murders tracked down, arrested and tried for their crimes.
