= Antoni Kiewnarski =

Polish military officer (1899–1944)

- Born: Antoni Wladyslaw Kiewnarski; 26 January 1899; Moscow, Russia
- Died: 31 March 1944 (aged 45); Jelenia Gora formerly Hirschberg
- Burial place: Poznan Old Garrison Cemetery, Poland
- Military career
- Allegiance: Poland
- Branch: Polish Air Force
- Service years: 1917–1944
- Rank: Flight Lieutenant and Major
- Nickname: Tony
- Service number: P.0109
- Unit: No. 305 Polish Bomber Squadron
- Conflicts: World War I Polish-Soviet War; World War II: Invasion of Poland; Channel Front (POW)
- Awards: Mentioned in Despatches

Antoni Wladyslaw Kiewnarski (26 January 1899 – 31 March 1944) known as “Tony” was a Polish Vickers Wellington bomber “Observer and Captain” flying from England when he was taken prisoner during the Second World War. He is notable for the part he took in the 'Great Escape' from Stalag Luft III in March 1944 and as one of the men recaptured and subsequently shot by the Gestapo.

== Early life ==
Kiewnarski was born in Moscow, Russia. He enlisted in the Polish Army in August 1917 and served with distinction in three wars, World War I, the Polish-Soviet War and World War II transferring to the Polish Air Force and rising through the ranks to senior sergeant and later commissioned officer.

== War service ==

After the German and Soviet invasions of Poland in September 1939 Kiewnarski travelled to France and later to England to continue the fight against the occupiers of Poland. In England Kiewnarski continued to fly and became a flight lieutenant in the Free Polish Air Force serving with No. 305 Polish Bomber Squadron flying Vickers Wellington bombers from RAF Ingham. He was an “Observer” (the aircrew role of Navigator /Bomb Aimer) and in command of the aircraft and its crew. He survived a serious crash on the night of 17 – 18 April 1942 when his crew were flying Vickers Wellington (serial number W5566) tasked with bombing Hamburg. They had to drop their bombs in the area of Tierschelling because of engine trouble and had to make their return flight on only one engine. While attempting to land at RAF Lindholme the aircraft collided with another Wellington which was parked on the ground. Five of the Polish crew in W5566 were slightly injured and the tail gunner escaped injury.

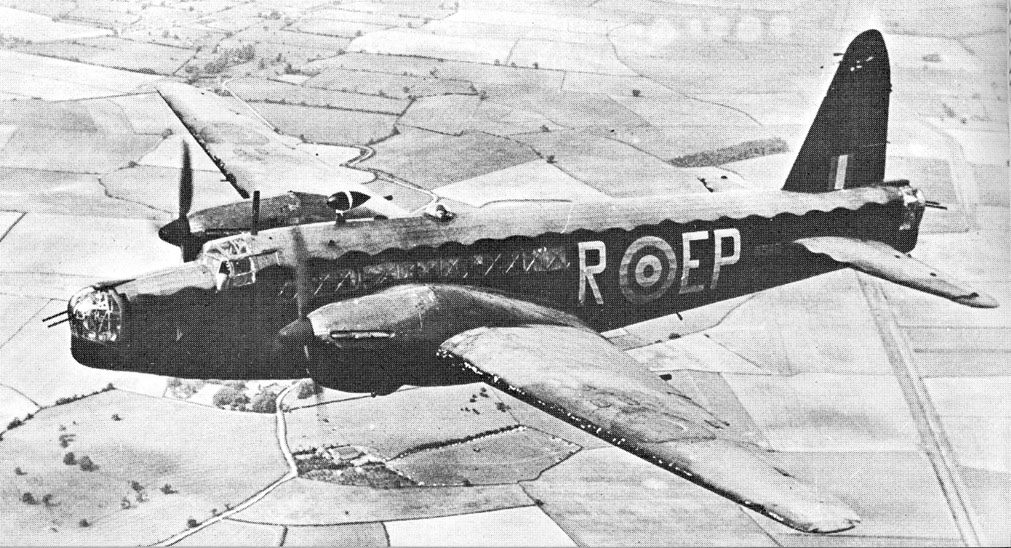
The Merlin-engined Wellington Mark II. This aircraft actually belongs to No. 104 Sqn.

== Prisoner of war ==
Kiewnarski was in command of Vickers Wellington Mark IV (squadron codes SM-D, serial number “Z1245”) on the night 27 – 28 August 1942 attacking the German target at Kassel. His aircraft was shot down by a German night fighter near Eindhoven when three of the crew were killed. He and his wireless operator sergeant Frankowski were captured by the Germans, Frankowski was wounded and after treatment managed to escape and return to England. Kiewnarski went straight into the prison camp system as prison of war number 42,801. He ended up in prisoner of war camp Stalag Luft III in the province of Lower Silesia near the town of Sagan (now Żagań in Poland). In prison camp he was regarded as the elder statesman of the Polish prisoners.

== 'Great Escape' ==
Kiewnarski was one of the 76 men who escaped the prison camp on the night of 24–25 March 1944 in the escape now famous as "the Great Escape". The initial groups out of the tunnel were those who needed a head start in order to get to the local railway station and catch their appropriate trains. He was in the first group of “walkers” who followed, they were led by Williy Williams and posed as a band of lumber mill workers on leave and included Australian Rusty Kierath, Canadian Jim Wernham and Pole Kaz Pawluk.

Memorial to "The Fifty" down the road toward Żagań (Kiewnarski at right)

In a filthy cold night they headed east towards the railway lines and then south to Tschiebsdorf railway station where Jerzy Mondschein used a forged travel pass to buy tickets for the group of twelve on the 6AM train to Boberrohrsdorf three hours south where they split up. Kiewnarski and Kaz Pawluk arrived in Hirschberg (now Jelenia Gora ) but while walking through the town during the afternoon were arrested and interrogated in the town police station before being held in the local jail with other recaptured escapees.

On the morning of 29 March 1944, Kaz Pawluk and Kiewnarski were taken away. Later that same day, Jim Wernham and Nick Skantzikas were removed from the cell. The four were shot near Hirschberg (now Jelenia Gora ). Urns were received at the camp bearing the date of 30 March, with their names but no location of cremation. On the morning of 30 March, Doug Poynter and Pop Green were told they were being taken back to Sagan. When they reached the camp, the officer in charge refused to accept them and they were taken back to the jail. After a while, the two men were returned to Sagan and spent time in solitary confinement. Kiewnarski was one of the 50 escapers who had been selected by SS-Gruppenfuhrer Arthur Nebe to be killed. These executions were carried out by the Gestapo. The place where he was cremated is unconfirmed. His remains are now buried in part of the Poznan Old Garrison Cemetery, where his headstone shows the rank of major. Kiewnarski is commemorated on the Polish Air Force Memorial at Northolt, Middlesex. His name was on the list of murdered officers, which was published by newspapers on 20 May 1944.

Nationalities of the 50 executed
(United Kingdom) 21 British
(Canada) 6 Canadian
(Poland) 6 Polish
(Australia) 5 Australian
(South Africa) 3 South African
(New Zealand) 2 New Zealanders
(Norway) 2 Norwegian
(Belgium) 1 Belgian
(Czechoslovakia) 1 Czechoslovak
(France) 1 Frenchman
(Greece) 1 Greek
(Lithuania) 1 Lithuanian

== Awards ==
His conspicuous bravery as a prisoner was recognized by a Mention in Despatches as none of the other relevant decorations then available could be awarded posthumously.

== Other victims ==
The Gestapo executed a group of 50 of the recaptured prisoners representing almost all of the nationalities involved in the escape. Post-war investigations saw a number of those guilty of the murders tracked down, arrested and tried for their crimes.
