= Reginald Kierath =

Australian bomber pilot during World War II

- Born: Reginald Victor Kierath; 20 February 1915; Narromine, New South Wales, Australia
- Died: 29 March 1944 (aged 29); Jelenia Góra
- Burial place: Poznań Old Garrison Cemetery, Poland
- Military career
- Allegiance: Australia
- Branch: Royal Australian Air Force
- Service years: 1940–1944
- Rank: Flight Lieutenant
- Nickname: Rusty
- Service number: Aus.402364
- Unit: No. 450 Squadron RAAF
- Conflicts: World War II; North African Campaign (POW)
- Awards: Mentioned in Despatches

Reginald "Rusty" Kierath (20 February 1915 – 29 March 1944) was an Australian Handley Page Hampden bomber pilot who was taken prisoner during the Second World War. He took part in the 'Great Escape' from Stalag Luft III in March 1944 and was one of the men recaptured and subsequently shot by the Gestapo.

== Pre-war life ==
Kierath was born in Narromine, New South Wales, Australia the youngest of the nine children of Ada Elise and William Kierath of German descent who owned the general store. In 1929 he left Narromine to attend Shore School and graduated in 1933. Willy Williams, another "Great Escaper", was also educated at Shore School. Kierath was a good sportsman and also achieved reasonable academic results sufficient to gain a position with the Bank of Australasia. He spent a year serving with 17th Battalion Australian Army.

== War service ==
Kierath joined the Royal Australian Air Force on 2 August 1940, to learn to fly and was one a six hundred Australians to complete basic training and preliminary flight training before being posted in December 1940 to Southern Rhodesia to do their full flight training . His brother Captain Greg Kierath was serving with an Australian Anti-Tank company and was killed at Tobruk on 14 April 1941 on about the date when Kierath gained his pilot's aircrew brevet. Rusty Kierath graduated as a pilot on 10 June 1941 and was posted to No. 71 Operational Training Unit as a fighter pilot, in mid-August 1941 he joined No. 33 Squadron RAF in the Western Desert flying the Hawker Hurricane from Amriyah in Egypt. During his initial operational service he was once strafed while taking off and once had to crash land after being shot up by Messerschmitt Bf 109s, but on 22 November 1941 he damaged two Luftwaffe Junkers Ju 88 medium bombers and in early December shot up an Italian Army transport column. On 20 December 1941 Kierath and a squadron mate shot down an Italian Air Force troop carrier aircraft. On 8 January 1942 he was posted to No. 450 Squadron RAAF, commissioned in May 1942 he completed his first tour on 31 July 1942 and trained as a fighter pilot instructor at Belvedere flying school before doing a five-month instructing tour in Rhodesia and being promoted to flying officer. Kierath requested a return to operational flying and on 23 February 1943 returned to No. 450 Squadron RAAF still flying P-40 Kittyhawk fighters.

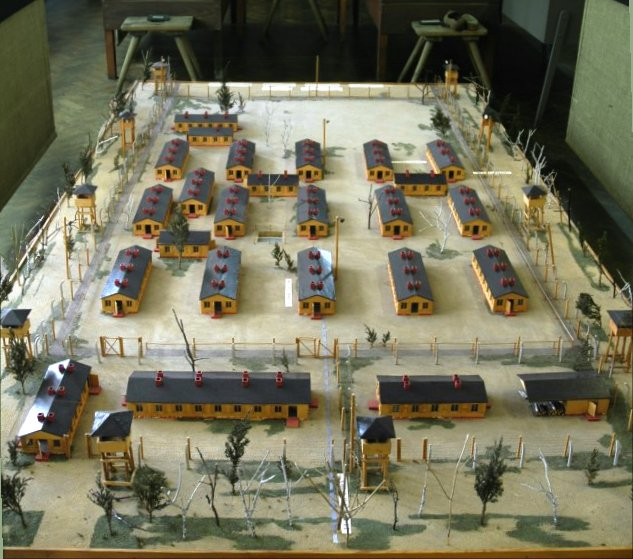
Model of Stalag Luft III prison camp

== Prisoner of war ==
Kierath was flying with a flight of fighters on an anti-shipping strike on 23 April 1943 about 24 kilometres (15 mi) off Cap Bon when they received heavy anti-aircraft fire from a German vessel and the strikes on his fighter caused the engine to seize. Kierath had to bail out and landed in the sea where he was rescued two hours later and taken prisoner by the Germans. He was checked out by the German medical team to ensure that he was unhurt before being placed in a temporary prisoner compound in Tunis and later shipped to Sicily for onward transit to Germany. He was eventually put into prisoner of war camp Stalag Luft III in the province of Lower Silesia near the town of Sagan (now Żagań in Poland). In prison camp he established himself as a "hide specialist" constructing small hide-aways in the accommodation blocks to permit forged papers and other escape essentials to be hidden from the German search teams.

== 'Great Escape' ==
Kierath was one of the 76 men who escaped the prison camp on the night of 24–25 March 1944 in the escape now famous as "the Great Escape". The initial groups out of the tunnel were those who needed a head start in order to get to the local railway station and catch their appropriate trains. He was in the first group of "walkers" who followed, they were led by Williy Williams and posed as a band of lumber mill workers on leave and included Canadian Jim Wernham and Poles Tony Kiewnarski and Kaz Pawluk.

Memorial to "The Fifty" down the road toward Żagań (Kierath at right)

In a filthy cold night they headed east towards the railway lines and then south to Tschiebsdorf railway station where Jerzy Mondschein used a forged travel pass to buy tickets for the group of twelve on the 6 am train to Boberrohrsdorf three hours south where they split up. Willy Williams and Rusty Kierath headed off and later joined up with "Johnny" Leslie George Bull and Jerzy Mondschein to trek through the Riesengebirge mountains where they were arrested by a mountain patrol trying to cross into occupied Czechoslovakia and taken to Reichenberg prison.

The four airmen were handed over to the Gestapo at 4 am on 29 March 1944 believing that they were to be returned to prison camp by road but near Jelenia Góra then called Hirschberg they were shot. Kierath was one of the 50 escapers who had been listed by SS-Gruppenführer Arthur Nebe to be killed, so was amongst those executed and murdered by the Gestapo. He was amongst those cremated at Brüx. His remains are now buried in part of the Poznań Old Garrison Cemetery.

The Australian press maintained a chase for information and justice for their murdered airmen. His name was on the list of murdered officers which was published by newspapers on 20 May 1944.

Nationalities of the 50 executed
(United Kingdom) 21 British
(Canada) 6 Canadian
(Poland) 6 Polish
(Australia) 5 Australian
(South Africa) 3 South African
(New Zealand) 2 New Zealanders
(Norway) 2 Norwegian
(Belgium) 1 Belgian
(Czechoslovakia) 1 Czechoslovak
(France) 1 Frenchman
(Greece) 1 Greek
(Lithuania) 1 Lithuanian

== Awards ==
His conspicuous bravery as a prisoner was recognized by a Mention in Despatches as none of the other relevant decorations then available could be awarded posthumously. It was published in a supplement to the London Gazette on 8 June 1944.

== Notes ==
On 25 March 2012, the Czech Republic held a ceremony honouring these men and unveiling a plaque in their memory in the city of Most (formerly Brüx) where they were murdered. The Czech Air Force organised a fly past and a Guard of Honour at the ceremony, which took place on the 68th anniversary of their escape. Members of the families of the four airmen met for the first time at this event.

== Other victims ==
The Gestapo executed a group of 50 of the recaptured prisoners representing almost all of the nationalities involved in the escape. Post-war investigations saw a number of those guilty of the murders tracked down, arrested and tried for their crimes.
