= Kazimierz Pawluk =

- Born: Kazimierz Pawluk; 1 July 1906; Warsaw, Poland
- Died: 31 March 1944 (aged 37); Jelenia Gora formerly Hirschberg
- Burial place: Poznan Old Garrison Cemetery, Poland
- Military career
- Allegiance: Poland
- Branch: Polish Air Force
- Service years: 1929–1944
- Rank: Flying Officer and Porucznik
- Nickname: Kaz
- Service number: P.0740
- Unit: No. 305 Polish Bomber Squadron
- Conflicts: World War II: Invasion of Poland; Channel Front (POW)
- Awards: Mentioned in Despatches

Kazimierz Pawluk (1 July 1906 – 31 March 1944) known as “Kaz” was a Polish Vickers Wellington bomber “Observer and Captain” flying from England when he was taken prisoner during the Second World War. He is notable for the part he took in the 'Great Escape' from Stalag Luft III in March 1944 and as one of the men recaptured and subsequently shot by the Gestapo.

== Early life ==
Pawluk was born in Warsaw, Poland. He enlisted in the Polish Army before 1930 later transferring to the Polish Air Force and rising through the ranks to become a commissioned officer.

== War service ==
After the German and Soviet invasions of Poland in September 1939 Pawluk travelled to France and later to England to continue the fight against the occupiers of Poland. In England he continued to fly and became a flying officer in the Free Polish Air Force serving with No. 305 Polish Bomber Squadron flying Vickers Wellington bombers from RAF Ingham. He was an “Observer” (the aircrew role of Navigator /Bomb Aimer) and in Polish tradition was in command of the aircraft and its crew.

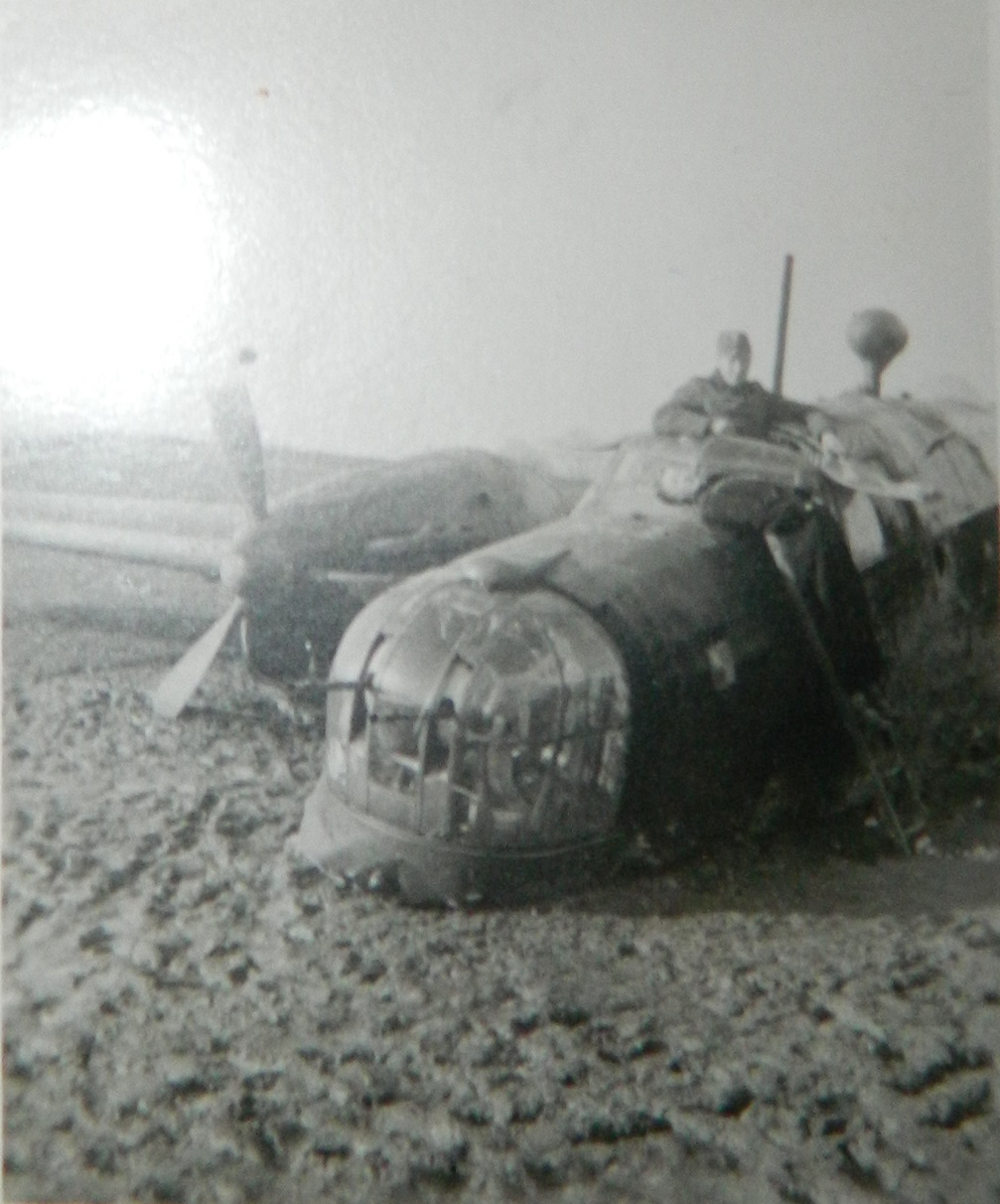
Wreck of the Wellington Mark II SM-M of F/O Kazimierz Pawluk.

== Prisoner of war ==
Pawluk was in command of Vickers Wellington Mark II (squadron codes SM-M, serial number “W5567”) which took off from RAF Lindholme at 21:23 hours GMT on the night 28–29 March 1942 to attack the German town of Lübeck. His aircraft was shot down by anti-aircraft fire and the crew had to bale out, all six being taken prisoner. He went straight into the prison camp system as prison of war number 23. He ended up in prisoner of war camp Stalag Luft III in the province of Lower Silesia near the town of Sagan (now Żagań in Poland) where he and Tom Kirby-Green shared in the care of a stray cat and her kittens.

== 'Great Escape' ==
Pawluk was one of the 76 men who escaped the prison camp on the night of 24–25 March 1944 in the escape now famous as "the Great Escape". The initial groups out of the tunnel were those who needed a head start in order to get to the local railway station and catch their appropriate trains. He was in the first group of “walkers” who followed, they were led by Williy Williams and posed as a band of lumber mill workers on leave, and included Australian Rusty Kierath, Johnny Bull, Doug Poynter, Ker-Ramsey, Canadian Jim Wernham and Pole Antoni Kiewnarski.

Memorial to "The Fifty" down the road toward Żagań (Pawluk at right)

In a filthy cold night they headed east towards the railway lines and then south to Tschiebsdorf railway station where Jerzy Mondschein used a forged travel pass to buy tickets for the group of twelve on the 6AM train to Boberrohrsdorf three hours south where they split up. Antoni Kiewnarski and Kaz Pawluk arrived in Hirschberg (now Jelenia Gora ) but while walking through the town during the afternoon were arrested and interrogated in the town police station before being held in the local jail with other recaptured escapees. On the morning of 29 March 1944 Jim Wernham and Nick Skantzikas were removed from the cell and then during the afternoon Doug Poynter and Pop Green. Two days later on the morning of 31 March 1944 Kaz Pawluk and Antoni Kiewnarski were taken away. They were shot near Hirschberg (now Jelenia Gora ) Pawluk was one of the 50 escapers who had been listed by SS-Gruppenfuhrer Arthur Nebe to be killed so was amongst those executed and murdered by the Gestapo. The place he was cremated is unknown.

His remains are now buried in part of the Poznan Old Garrison Cemetery. Pawluk is commemorated on the Polish Air Force Memorial at Northolt, Middlesex. His name was on the list of murdered officers which was published by newspapers on 20 May 1944.

Nationalities of the 50 executed
(United Kingdom) 21 British
(Canada) 6 Canadian
(Poland) 6 Polish
(Australia) 5 Australian
(South Africa) 3 South African
(New Zealand) 2 New Zealanders
(Norway) 2 Norwegian
(Belgium) 1 Belgian
(Czechoslovakia) 1 Czechoslovak
(France) 1 Frenchman
(Greece) 1 Greek
(Lithuania) 1 Lithuanian

== Awards ==
His conspicuous bravery as a prisoner was recognized by a Mention in Despatches as none of the other relevant decorations then available could be awarded posthumously.

== Other victims ==
The Gestapo executed a group of 50 of the recaptured prisoners representing almost all of the nationalities involved in the escape. Post-war investigations saw a number of those guilty of the murders tracked down, arrested and tried for their crimes.
