= Leslie George Bull =

Royal Air Force officer

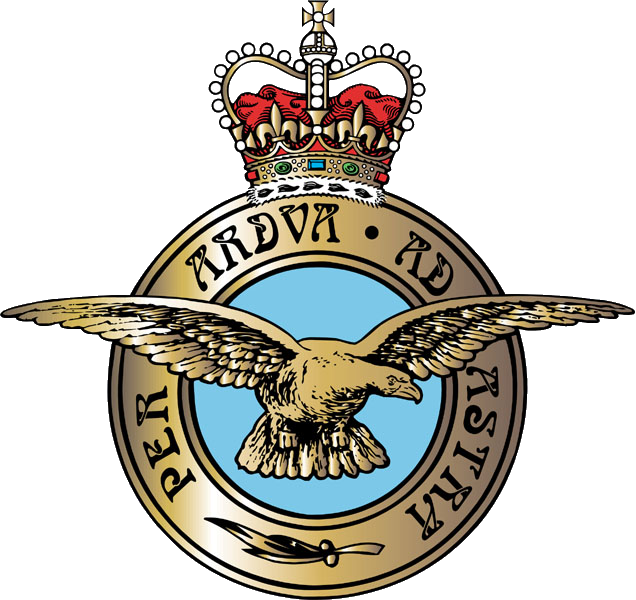
- Born: Leslie George Bull; 7 August 1916; Highbury, London
- Died: 29 March 1944 (aged 27) between Reichenberg and Brux
- Burial place: Poznan Old Garrison Cemetery, Poland
- Military career
- Allegiance: United Kingdom
- Branch: Royal Air Force
- Service years: 1936–1944
- Rank: Flight lieutenant
- Nicknames: Les, Johnny and Lester
- Service number: 43932
- Units: No. 75 Squadron RAF; No. 9 Squadron RAF; No. 109 Squadron RAF
- Conflicts: World War II: Channel Front (POW)
- Awards: Distinguished Flying Cross; Mentioned in despatches

Leslie George Bull (7 August 1916 – 29 March 1944), known as Johnny, Les or Lester Bull, was a British Vickers Wellington bomber pilot who was taken prisoner during the Second World War. He took part in the 'Great Escape' from Stalag Luft III in March 1944, but was one of the men re-captured and subsequently shot by the Gestapo.

== Pre-war life ==
Bull was born in Highbury, London, on 7 August 1916, and was educated locally in the council school. Having achieved school certificate passes he was able to progress to the London County Council School of Building at Brixton in south west London to train as an architect, however in July 1936 after three years of study he decided to leave and join the Royal Air Force. Enlisting as an aircraftman 2nd class (service number 580284) he was accepted for pilot training and gained his pilot's wings before joining No. 75 Squadron RAF to fly Handley Page Harrow heavy bombers. In 1938 while stationed at RAF Driffield he met and later married Kathleen, they had a son, David.

== War service ==
Serving operationally as a sergeant-pilot, Bull joined No. 9 Squadron RAF on 24 February 1940 now flying Vickers Wellington bombers. He was commissioned as a pilot officer on 13 June 1940. at about the time he was posted to the Blind Approach Training Development Unit (Boscombe Down) who needed experienced pilots for testing and developing the blind approach aid that would eventually help many night bomber crews as they struggled to land at airfields in bad weather. On 30 October 1940 BATDU was re-designated WIDU (Wireless Intelligence Development Unit) and on 10 December 1940 became No. 109 Squadron RAF flying Avro Anson and Vickers Wellington aircraft it was engaged during the next two years in development of radio counter-measures and also new radar aids, notably the blind bombing system known as Oboe later used so successfully by the Pathfinder Force. He was promoted to flying officer on 13 June 1941 (with seniority from 25 April 1941), and awarded the Distinguished Flying Cross on 18 July 1941 in recognition of a dangerous tour of duty. He was promoted to flight lieutenant on 13 June 1942.

== Prisoner of war ==
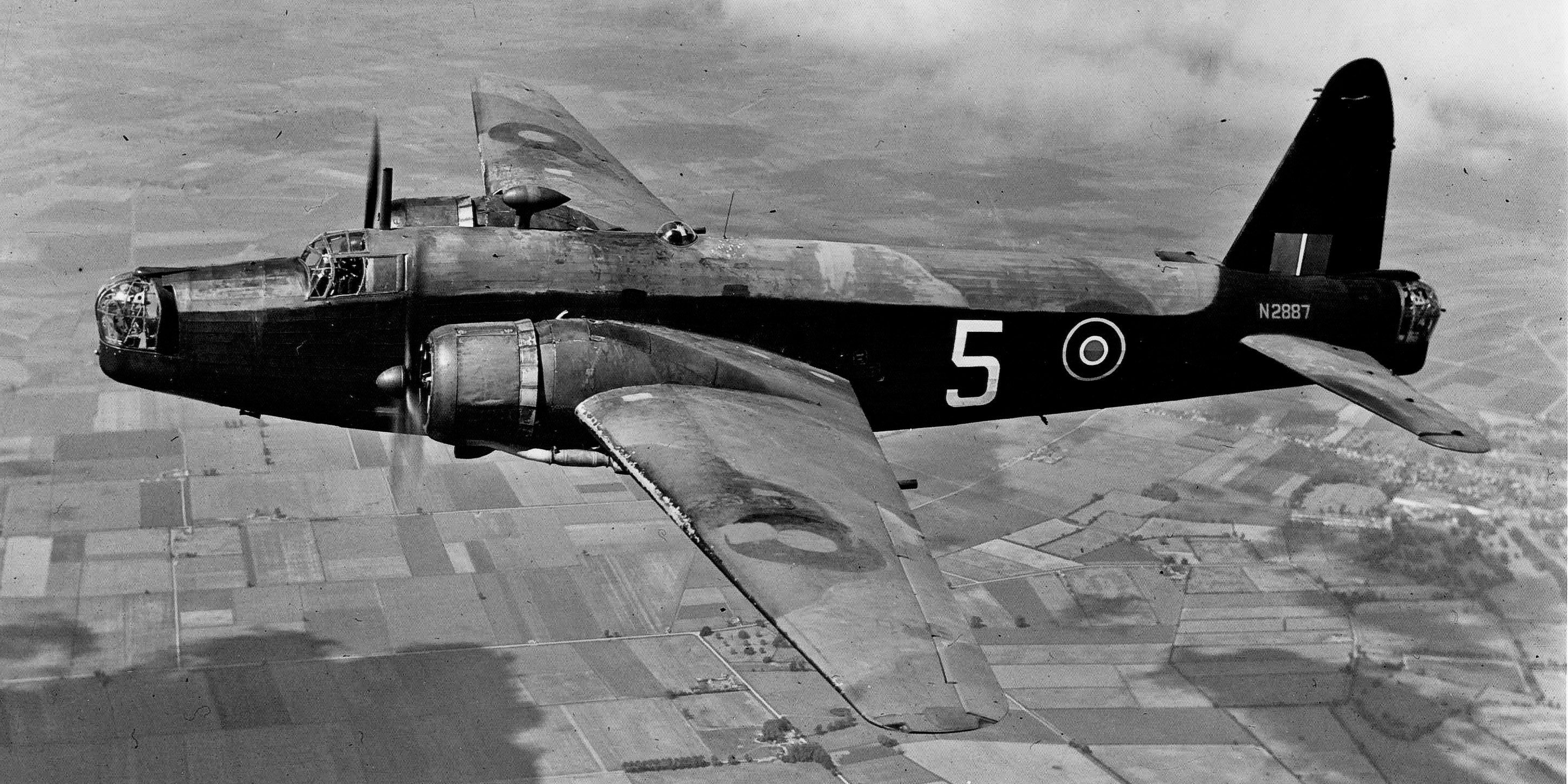
Wellington bomber.

At 1830 on the evening of 5 November 1941 Bull took off in a Wellington Mark Ic bomber (serial number T2562) from Boscombe Down on a Special Duties mission to investigate the capabilities of the German radar chain sites along the west coast of France. One of his crew members was Flight Lieutenant Bill Grisman who later also participated in the Great Escape. Over the French port of Lorient the starboard engine failed and then lost its propeller. Unable to continue Bull held the aircraft level while his crew of five baled out and then followed himself being taken prisoner on landing by parachute in France. Becoming a prisoner of war he was interrogated by the Luftwaffe before being sent to Stalag Luft I Barth as prisoner of war No. 667 where he made himself a general nuisance to the German guards (a popular pastime amongst bored RAF prisoners) and there he brewed illegal potato skin alcohol for Christmas celebrations. At Stalag Luft I Bull met Roger Bushell during various tunnelling escape attempts, Bushell later masterminded the Great Escape.

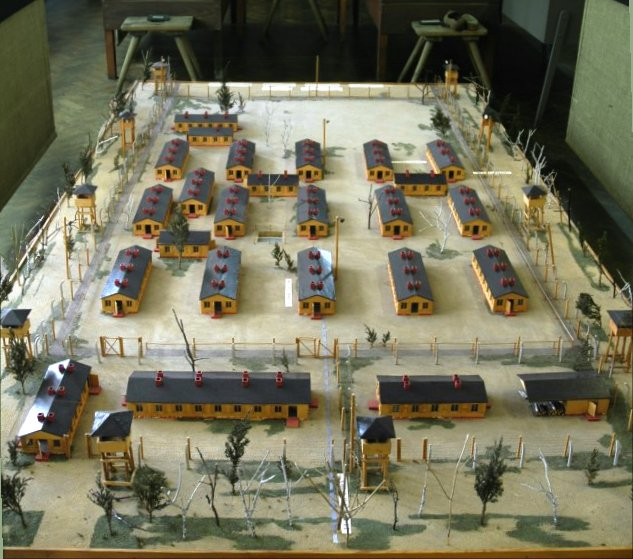
Model of Stalag Luft III prison camp.

Bull was part of the group with Bushell who were sent to Stalag Luft III in the province of Lower Silesia near the town of Sagan (now Żagań in Poland). He had no fear of enclosed spaces and was an enthusiastic tunneller.

== 'Great Escape' ==
For the Great Escape operation Bull was one of the leading tunnellers, described as a "shift boss" in other sources. Bull was designated to be the first of the 76 men who escaped the prison camp on the night of 24–25 March 1944 in the escape now famous as "the Great Escape". He was to be at the far end of the tunnel where a temporary underground hatch had been built, he was to remove the hatch and break through the earth providing the escape route. When the tunnel was found to be a little short of the tree line he is credited as the man who quickly came up with the scheme to use a length of rope to signal when the German guards were clear and men should emerge from the trap door and run to the cover of the woods.

Travelling in a group of four escapees with Rusty Kierath, Jerzy Mondschein and Willy Williams, their plan was to catch a train at a small station south of Sagan to Bober-Rohrsdorf near Hirschberg, close to the Czech frontier. They got well to the south of Hirschberg The four made it into the Riesengebirge (mountain range) but were arrested by a mountain patrol and taken to Reichenberg prison, inside Czechoslovakia. The four were taken from the prison by officials of the Gestapo at 0400 hours on 29 March 1944 and were shot and cremated, the cremation urns returned to Stalag Luft III were marked with the date 29 March 1944 and the name of the town Brux.

Bull was one of the 50 escapers executed and murdered by the Gestapo. Originally his remains were buried at Sagan, he is now buried in part of the Poznan Old Garrison Cemetery. Bull's name was amongst those in the list of the murdered prisoners which was published when news broke on or about 19–20 May 1944. The Glasgow Herald of 19 May 1944 published an early list naming several officers including Bull.

Memorial to "The Fifty" down the road toward Żagań (Bull is on the left)

== Awards ==
Bull received the following awards:

- the Distinguished Flying Cross on 18 July 1941 for his service with No.109 Squadron.
- a Mention in despatches for conspicuous gallantry as a prisoner of war (none of the other relevant decorations then available could be awarded posthumously). It was published in a supplement to the London Gazette on 8 June 1944.

== Commemoration ==
On 25 March 2012, the Czech Republic held a ceremony honouring these men and unveiling a plaque in their memory in the city of Most (formerly Brux) where they were murdered. The Czech Air Force organised a fly past and a Guard of Honour at the ceremony, which took place on the 68th anniversary of their escape. Members of the families of the four airmen met for the first time at this event.

== Other victims ==
See Stalag Luft III murders

The Gestapo executed a group of 50 of the recaptured prisoners representing almost all of the nationalities involved in the escape. Post-war investigations saw a number of those guilty of the murders tracked down, arrested and tried for their crimes.

Nationalities of the 50 executed
(United Kingdom) 21 British
(Canada) 6 Canadian
(Poland) 6 Polish
(Australia) 5 Australian
(South Africa) 3 South African
(New Zealand) 2 New Zealanders
(Norway) 2 Norwegian
(Belgium) 1 Belgian
(Czechoslovakia) 1 Czechoslovak
(France) 1 Frenchman
(Greece) 1 Greek
(Lithuania) 1 Lithuanian
