= Dominic Bruce =

British Royal Air Force officer (1915–2000)

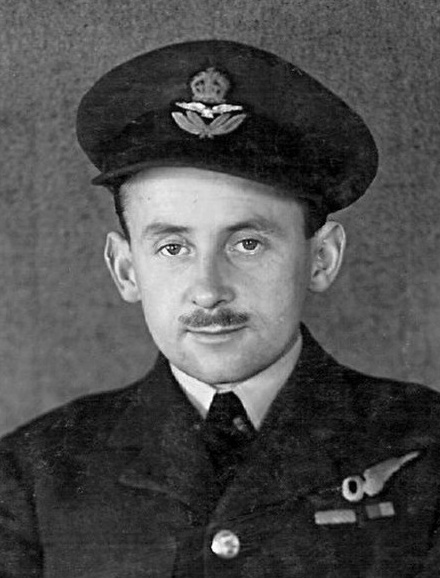
- Dominic Bruce
- Born: 7 June 1915; Hebburn, County Durham, England
- Died: 12 February 2000 (aged 84); Richmond, Surrey, England
- Burial place: Teddington Cemetery, Section Y, Grave 69.
- Military career
- Allegiance: United Kingdom
- Branch: Royal Air Force
- Service years: 1935–1946
- Rank: Flight Lieutenant
- Nicknames: The "Medium Sized Man", "Medium Sized Officer", "Bruce", "Brucie" and "Der Kleine"
- Service number: 45272
- Units: No. 9 Squadron; No. 214 Squadron
- Conflicts: Second World War
- Awards: Officer of the Order of the British Empire; Military Cross; Air Force Medal; Knight of the Order of St. Gregory the Great (Holy See)
- Other work: College principal

Dominic Bruce, OBE, MC, AFM, KSG (7 June 1915 – 12 February 2000) was a British Royal Air Force officer, known as the "Medium Sized Man." He has been described as "the most ingenious escaper" of the Second World War. He made seventeen attempts at escaping from POW camps, including several attempts to escape from Colditz Castle, a castle that housed prisoners of war "deemed incorrigible". He was named by Jim Rogers ("Tunnelling into Colditz") as one of the ten 'Kings of Colditz', the men who "dedicated their waking hours only to the idea of escaping".

Famed for his time in Colditz, Bruce also escaped from Spangenberg Castle and the Warburg POW camp. In Spangenberg Castle he master minded the Swiss Red Cross Commission escape described by Aidan Crawley in his book 'Escape from Germany. A History of R.A.F. Escapes during the War' (1956). It is also argued he co-innovated the wooden horse escape technique while serving time inside Spangenberg. In Warburg he escaped dressed as a British orderly in a fake workers party. Inside Colditz Castle, Bruce authored the Tea Chest Escape and also faced a firing squad for an attempted escape via a sewer tunnel. While held in solitude in Colditz Bruce, along with two other prisoners, became a key witness to the post war Musketoon commando raid trial.

He is notable for being (along with Hank Wardle) one of the only two men who escaped from both Spangenberg and Colditz prison camps during World War II.

For his exploits, Bruce was awarded the Military Cross and is the only known person to have received both the Military Cross and the Air Force Medal. Bruce has also featured prominently in books, sound recordings, TV and film. In his later years he was appointed an Officer of the Order of the British Empire for his services to education.

== Early years ==
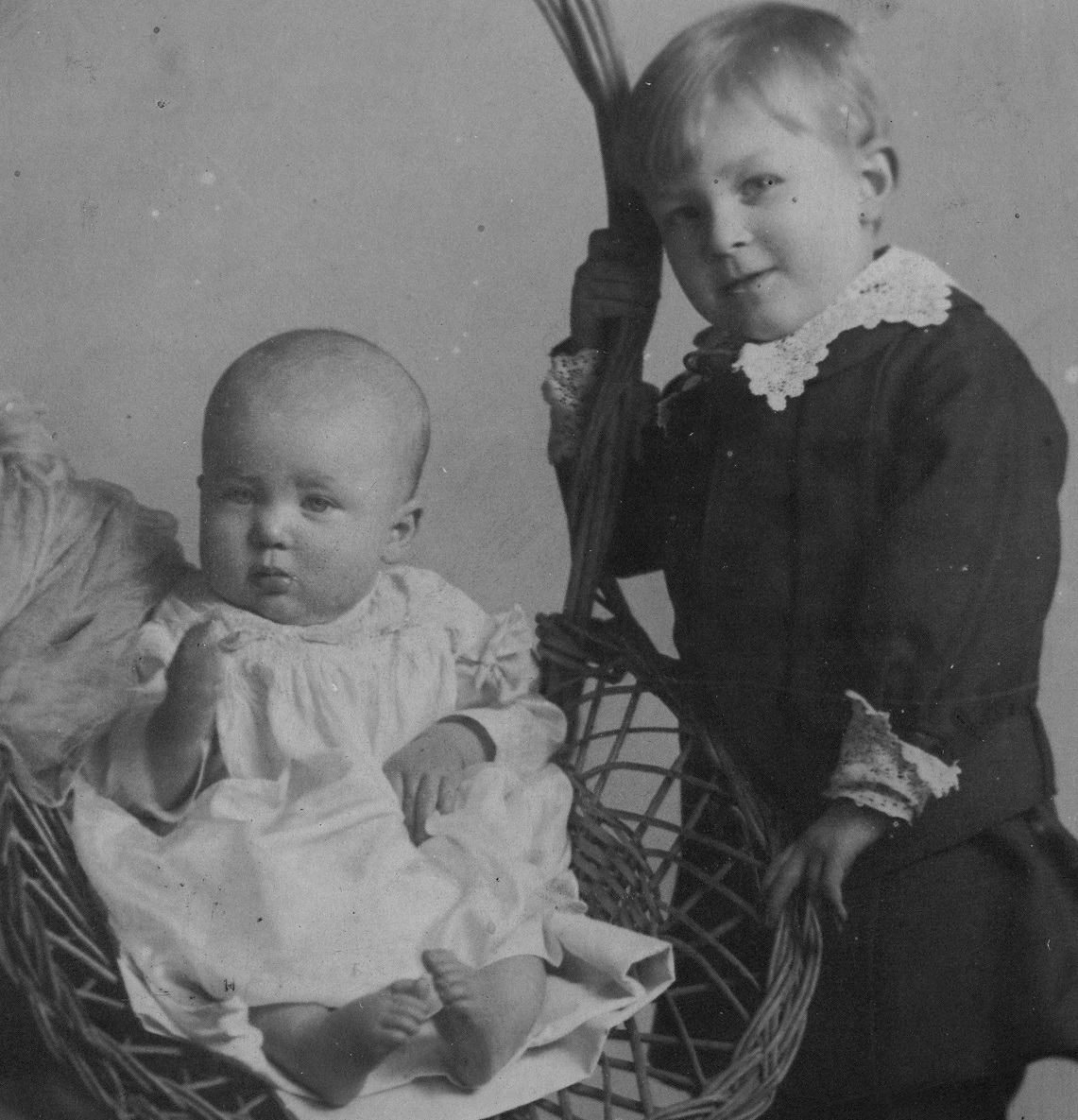
Dominic Bruce as a baby, with his elder brother, William.

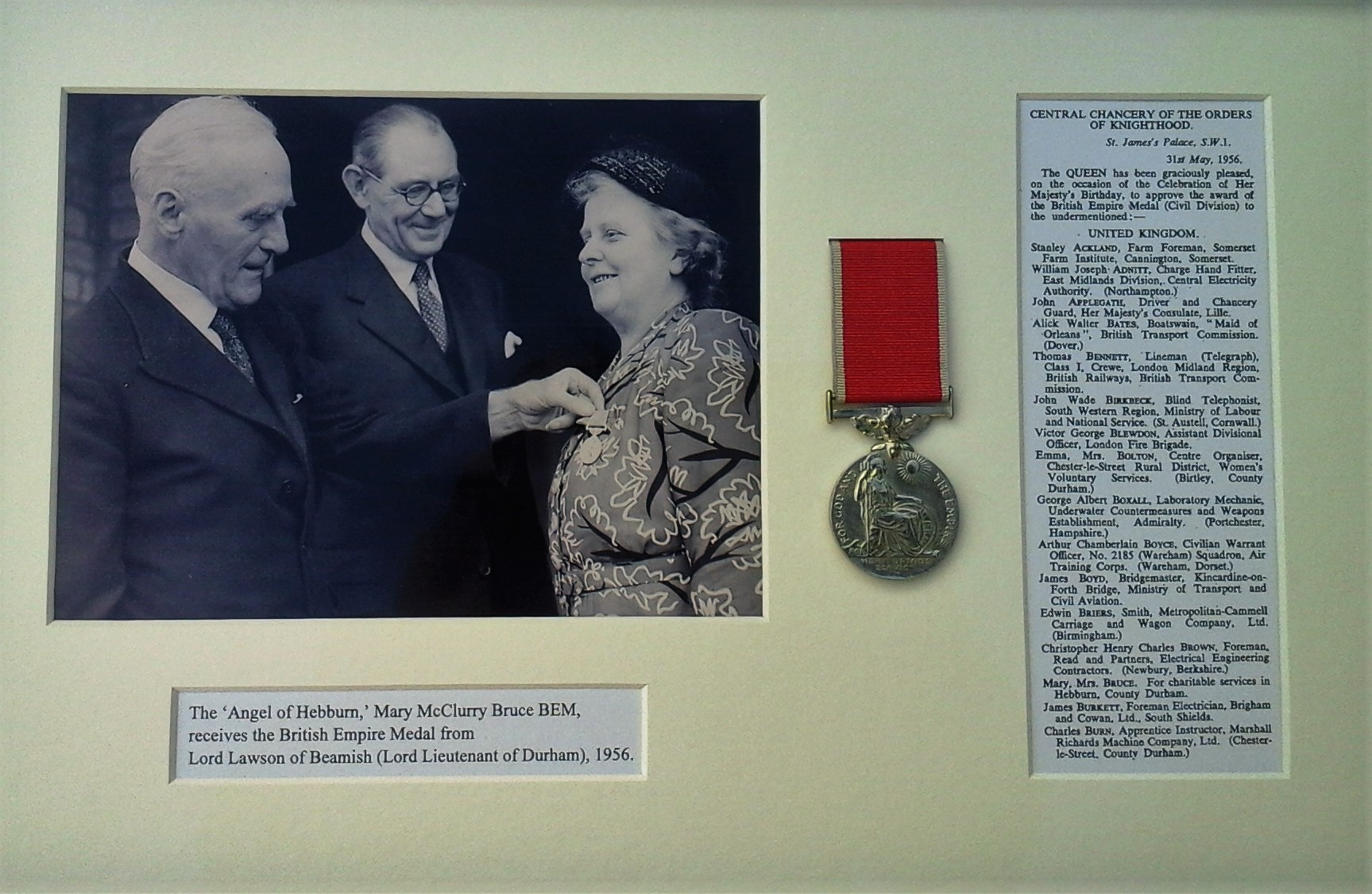
Mary McClurry Bruce (Bruce's mother) called 'The Angel of Hebburn' for her charity work amongst young mothers, receives the British Empire Medal from the trade unionist Lord Lieutenant of Durham, Lord Lawson of Beamish, a former school friend

Bruce was born on 7 June 1915, in Hebburn, County Durham, England. He was the second of the four children of William and Mary (née McClurry) Bruce. Mary Bruce was awarded the British Empire Medal in 1956 for her services to the care of the sick and infirm and was known as the 'Angel of Hebburn'.

His elder brother was Brother Thomas (William) Bruce, a member of the De La Salle religious congregation or Institute of the Brothers of the Christian Schools who died in Nazareth in 1974, and is buried in a wall tomb in the crypt of the University of Bethlehem. His two younger siblings were Anne Bruce-Kimber and John Bruce (who died 7 May 1925, aged 3).

Dominic Bruce's escaping adventures started early in his life when he ran away from home by means of a train to London. Remarkably on arrival in London he was recognised by a police officer married to his father's sister Anne. He was quickly returned to Shakespeare Avenue in Hebburn. Bruce was educated at and matriculated from St Cuthbert's Grammar School, Newcastle, 1927–1935.

He was of an adventurous disposition and as an alternative to his formal education he spent some time as an unauthorised visitor to the Newcastle Law Courts (Note: The Newcastle Law Courts are now on the Quayside. The courts Bruce would have frequented in his youth would have been the city's Moot Hall courthouse. The Moot Hall operated as law courts from 1812 to 1998.) during school time.

According to the Bruce family records, Bruce married Mary Lagan on 25 June 1938 at Corpus Christi Catholic Church, Maiden Lane.

== Early RAF career ==
On joining the Royal Air Force in 1935 he trained as a wireless operator, then as an airgunner. As a gunner and wireless operator, Bruce, the recruit, trained in the Hawker Hind, an open two-seated plane that came with a Lewis gun. One superior—if you did not listen— would turn the plane upside down. With the feet secured to the security straps, he would wangle you side to side.

=== Jankers ===
The unranked Bruce served his jankers. In the 1930s, the NCOs gave them out like confetti. Casually, they accused Bruce and the lads of sloppiness. And they filled up Bruce's charge sheet. For the minor misdeeds they could not fit on to the charge sheet — his time in solitary as a POW, equalled it out.

In November 1936, Bruce joined No. 214 Squadron at Scampton. Scampton was equipped with Virginias and Harrows.

=== Morton and the Scampton lads ===
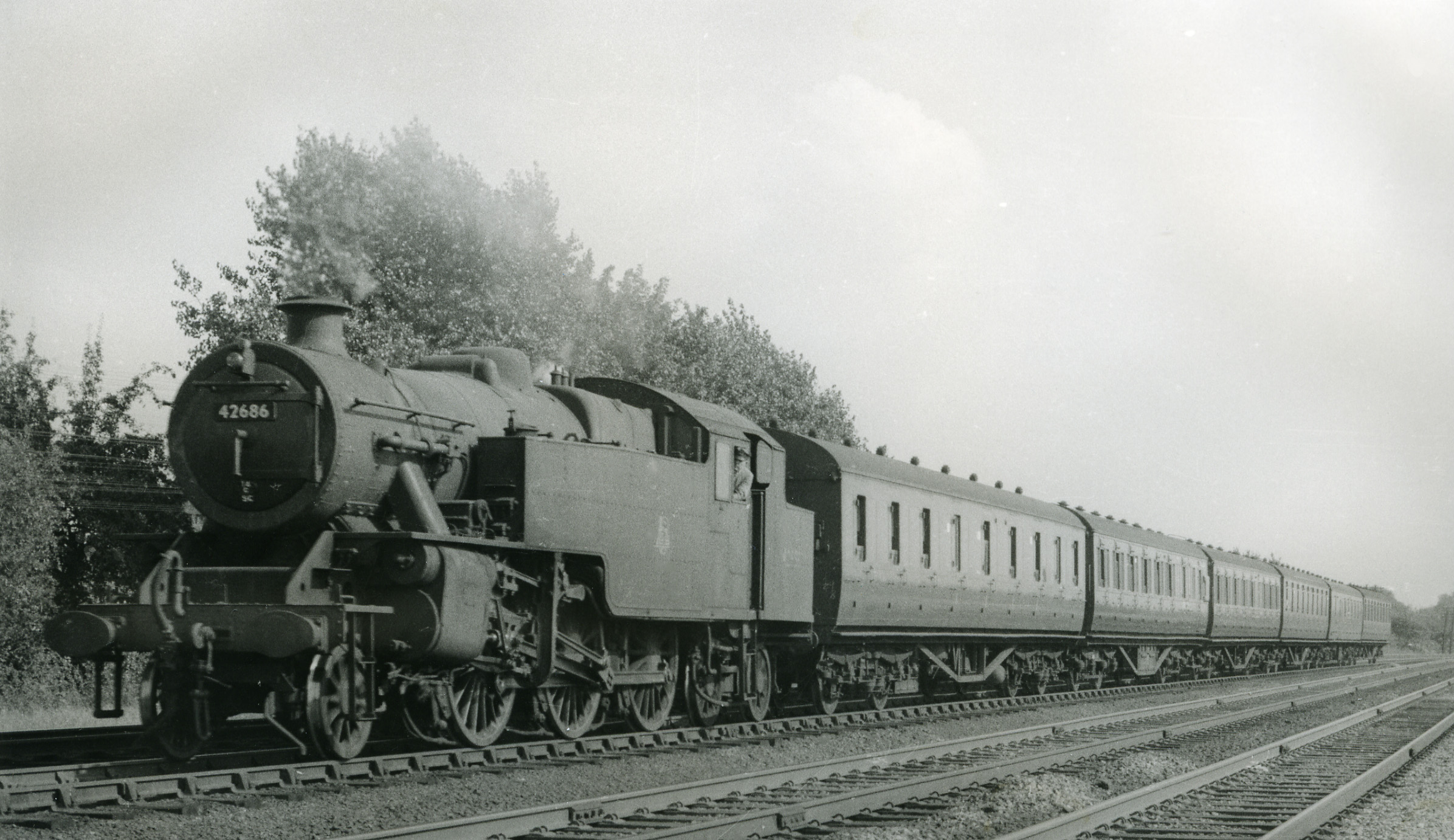
A train. 1937. Morton practised.

Trainees and aviators at Scampton practised. Mischievous, they mastered scaring train drivers. By the summer of 1937, low-flying, without reason, resulted in instant dismissal.

Spring time 1937, 25 March, the Handley Page Harrow "K6940" crash landed, the result of an unfortunate descent not judged well by the pilot, Flight Sergeant Morton. Bruce and five others were on board. The plane landed 10 km away from the Handley Page Radlett airfield. Morton's landing removed the roof off a train.

=== Air Force Medal ===
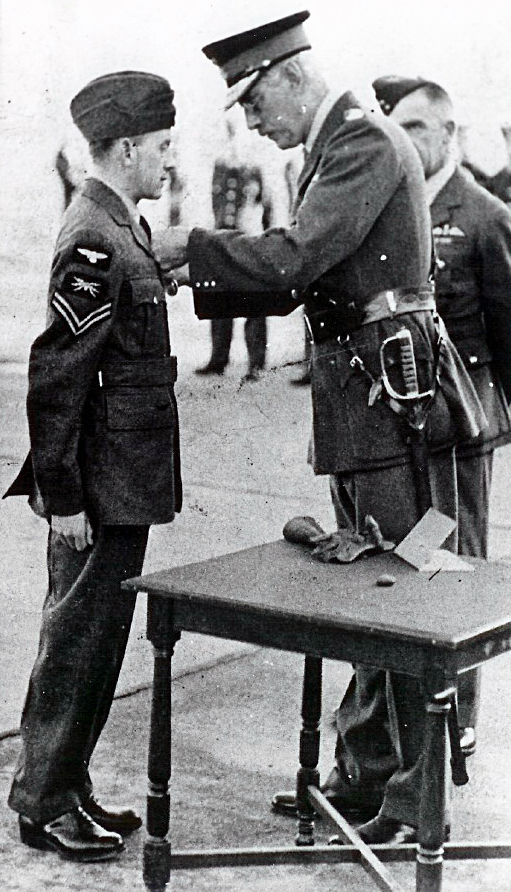
Dominic Bruce receives the Air Force Medal

On 6 October 1938, while with No. 214 Squadron, he survived the crash of Harrow "K6991" at Pontefract, Yorkshire. While acting as a wireless operator for his aircraft, he was knocked out by a lightning strike. Once recovered, he alerted his base to the fact that the crew were bailing out. Wishing to get out of an escape hatch, he found his way blocked by other airmen who were hesitating about throwing themselves out of the aircraft into the howling darkness. He rushed to the other side of the hatch and jumped. His parachute harness caught on projecting clamps and pulled the trapdoor shut above him. Bruce was now suspended under the bomber and unable to escape further. Realising what had happened, his fellow crew members were now galvanised into action, raised the trapdoor and were shocked to have Bruce shoot back into the aircraft, though not too shocked to eject him again. Bruce was subsequently awarded the Air Force Medal (AFM) on 8 June 1939. (Note: Prior to the war, in 1938 when the incident took place, Bruce, new to his career, was only a Leading Aircraftman (LAC); therefore he received the Air Force Medal, rather than the Air Force Cross (AFC) which was given only to officers. This is explained in Pete Tunstall's book, 'The Last Escaper.' In the book, Tunstall argues this was needless discrimination against lower ranks.) According to Pete Tunstall, Bruce was very proud of being the only man known to have bailed from an aircraft three times and to have landed only twice. After the war he used to entertain his children with the seemingly insoluble riddle: "How is it that I baled out three times, but only landed twice?" Bruce called his AFM medal the 'Away From Mam' medal.

In March 1939, Bruce retrained as an air observer. He studied at the Bombing School Stranraer. He was promoted to Sergeant. And following the RAF tradition, the NCO lads tore up his jankers charge sheet.

== Second World War ==
On 1 September 1939, Hitler invaded Poland. On 3 September, Britain and France declared war on Germany.

Following his training, Bruce became an instructor at OTU Harwell. In May 1940, he was posted to No. 9 Squadron which was equipped with Vickers Wellingtons. After 25 operations, Bruce became the squadron's Navigation and Bombing Leader, which was a staff appointment with restricted operational flying duties. By 1940, Bruce had received an AFM, was part of the staff, was a qualified instructor, and had experience as a wireless operator, air-gunner and navigator with No. 9 Squadron. As he relates in the IWM tapes, he was in combat during the Dunkirk retreat, attempting to bomb the advancing German forces so that more British and French troops could cross the Channel safely.

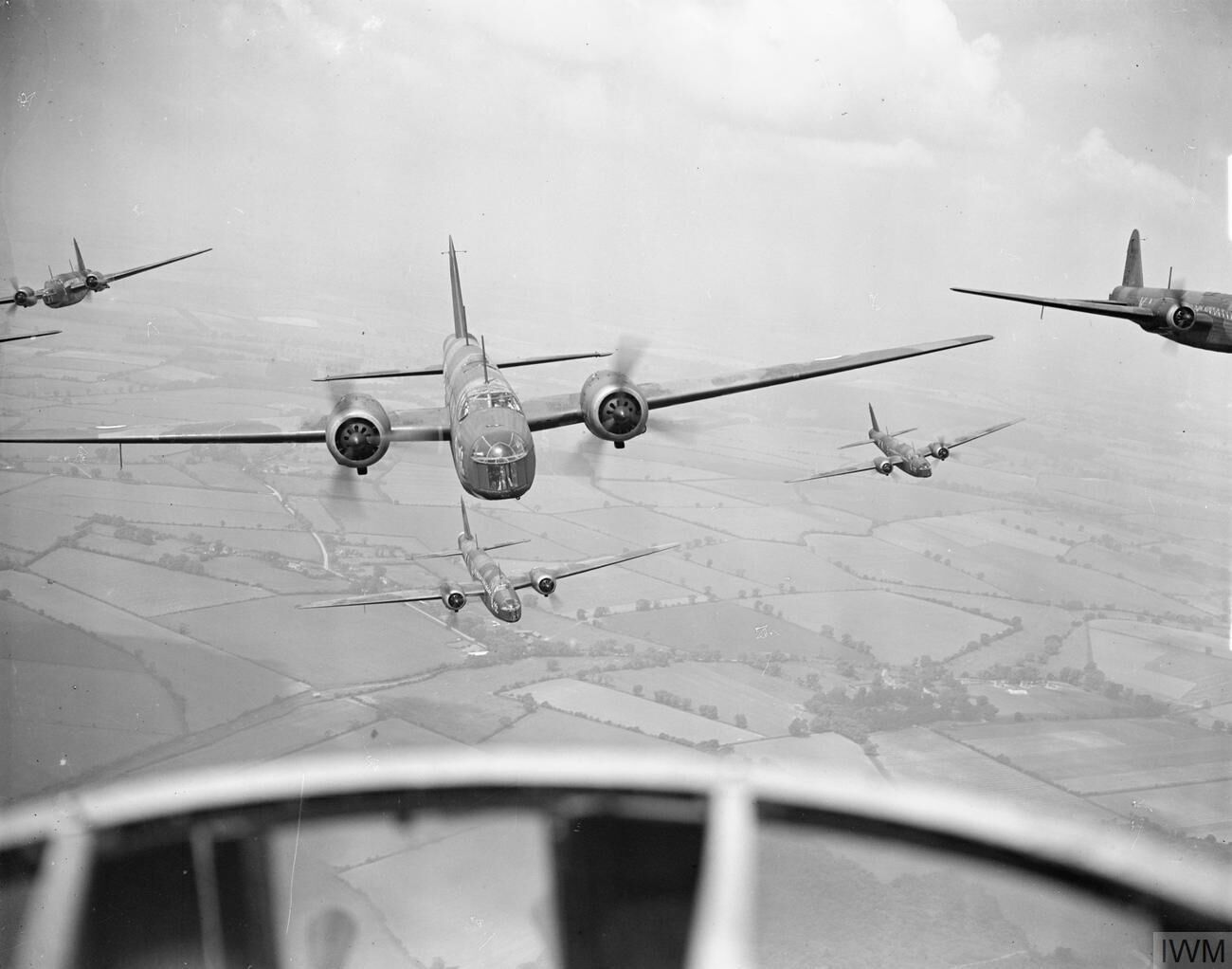
A formation of No. 9 Squadron's Wellingtons in the Second World War

His account (including a photo of the actual handwritten report) of a bombing raid, on military infrastructure in Leverkusen in 1940 can be read in 'Voices of Colditz.' The report describes the aircraft swinging around Cologne on a moonlit night, Bruce using the silver river Rhine as the navigational signpost; how the guns were firing more to make it look like a raid than to hit the aircraft; and how the run up in this raid was textbook. He finishes the report, mentioning the parking in the hangar; highlighting his workload filling up his bulky navigator's satchel and how he sadly climbed out of the plane on to nothing, resulting in him receiving a sprained ankle.

On 20 January 1941, Acting Flight Sergeant Bruce was granted a commission "for the duration of hostilities" as a probationary pilot officer, with seniority from 8 January. By June 1941 Bruce had been promoted to flying officer.

=== Camaraderie with messmates ===
==== Pranks ====
Bruce (far right) with Wellington bomber crew about to raid the battleships Scharnhorst and Gneisenau at Brest in April 1941 shortly before his capture

Bruce was a notorious prankster. In Pat Reid's book about Colditz, he describes how a group of new Navy entrants to the castle were horrified when a uniformed German doctor (in fact Howard Gee, one of the 'Prominente' hostages) insisted that they were lice-ridden and must strip naked for their private parts to be treated by his medical orderly. This alarming figure in white overalls would approach each man with a lavatory brush dipped in a bucket of evil smelling blue liquid (consisting of lavatory disinfectant and theatrical paint) and dab each man's genitals. The new boys would later realise that the evilly grinning orderly was Bruce.

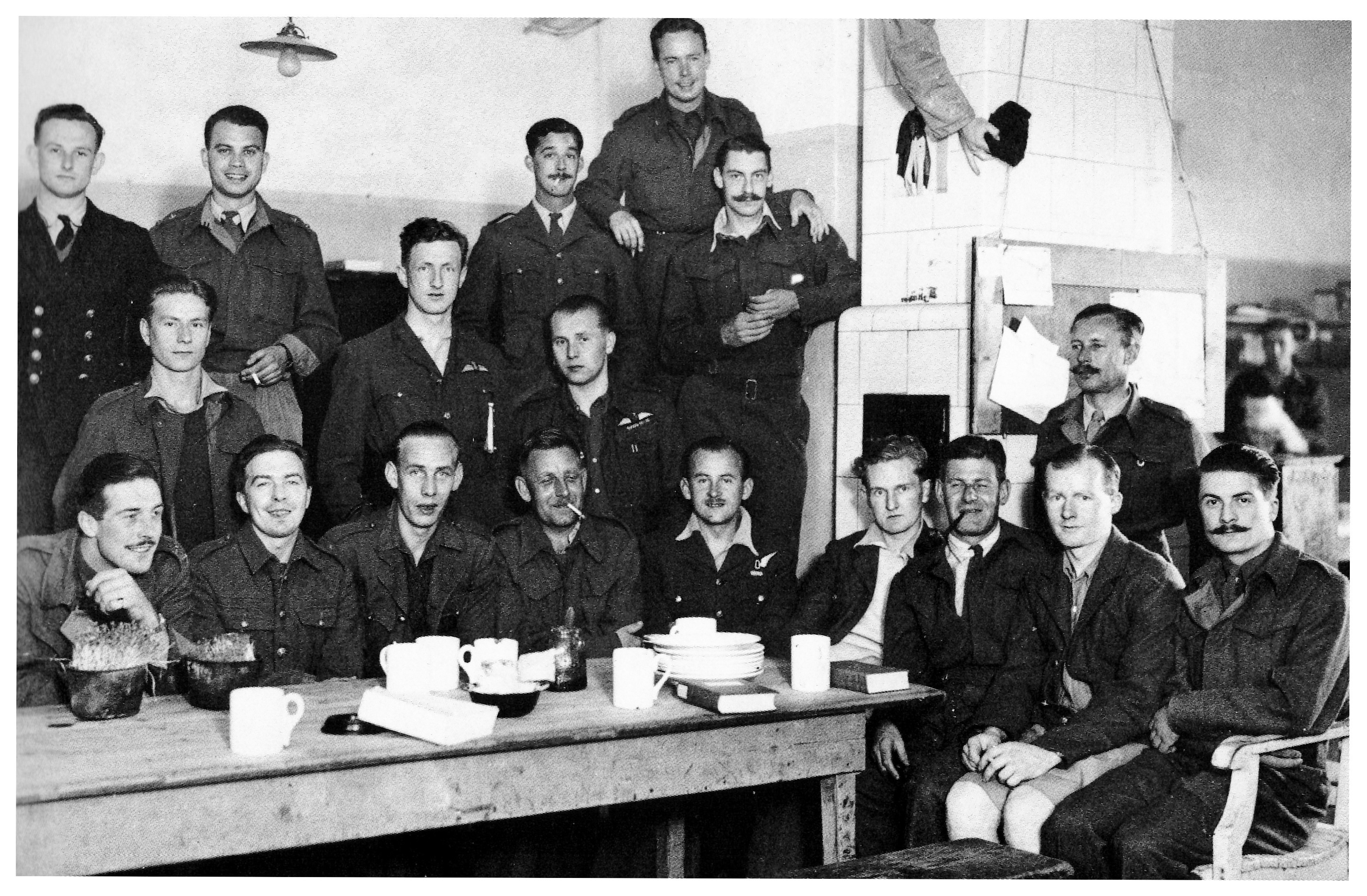
Bruce in Colditz, seated, fifth from left

In the IWM interview tapes held in the Imperial War Museum Sound Archive (which have now been published by the Bruce family on a publicly accessible web site https://www.thedominiclagangallery.com/the-medium-sized-man-speaks) Bruce tells the tale of a bombing mission over Berlin when he persuaded the pilot to descend to five hundred feet over the city. Bruce climbed down into the now empty bomb bay, hand cranked the doors open; sat on the bomb rack and threw a lit distress flare out of the plane. When asked later why, he answered "Because I've always wanted to see the Unter den Linden lit up at night."

In the same IWM interview tapes, Bruce describes a prank he played on some German soldiers who were guarding a working party of British soldiers. During the aftermath of the 'Tea Chest' escape, Bruce was travelling through Germany on a stolen bicycle and, coming across the file of soldiers being marched down a street, decided to cheer them up. He cycled up to the head of the column shouting out words of encouragement, saying they were not to worry because we were winning the war. On hearing the unmistakable tones of a British officer, the surprised soldiers started to cheer. Before the shocked guards could overcome their confusion and unsling their rifles to take aim at him, Bruce had accelerated around a corner and disappeared.

Bruce, like a lot of his comrades, participated in goon baiting. Reinhold Eggers was the Colditz Castle's security officer succeeding Priem, and like Priem, was a schoolmaster by profession. In his book 'Colditz: the German Story' (1961, translation by Howard Gee), Eggers describes how Bruce was fond of sowing confusion amongst the German guards during Appel, or roll call, using the 'rabbit run' prank. Bruce would stand in the ranks, wait until he had been counted, then duck quickly along the line, only to be counted again at the other end. This trick was also used for more serious purposes, to cover up for a missing escapee.

As a POW, Bruce would go on to spend eight months inside solitary confinement, mainly as a result of his escaping activities. Eggers knowing Bruce was a regular in the solitary cells, would explain to Bruce, upon each arrival to the cells that as Bruce already knew the rules, he would not read out the rules... Bruce in turn would always try to bait Eggers after this response, by always reasserting with humour, 'that if he did not read him out the rules..., he would do something to break rule 1..., and then break rule 2...; and break rule 3,' and so on... Under the Geneva Convention prisoners in solitary confinement were given a welcomed, one hour's exercise time. Eggers also used the exercise time to exercise his pet dog with the prisoners; this was welcomed by Bruce. Eggers in turn was noted by some prisoners as very controlled and fair when compared to a few other guards in the chain of command who advocated for corpses in the yard. Bruce explained Eggers as 'a man who could not be bribed,' Bruce's comrade, Tunstall, in contrast, wrote that though Eggers was believed to be an anti-Nazi, he was a man whom he and others could not trust, a man who was prejudiced after reading the exaggerated crime sheets, concocted by Rademacher, that got rid of Bruce and him to Colditz. Eggers was thought of as very composed and a tough guard to goon bait.

John 'Bosun' Chrisp explained that after their sewer drain escape attempt, Bruce billed the Kommandant and Staff Paymaster Heinze in the castle for £600 on behalf of Chrisp, Lorraine and Bruce, for their service of cleaning the drains that had not been cleaned for 300 years.

==== Ausweis, travel documents ====
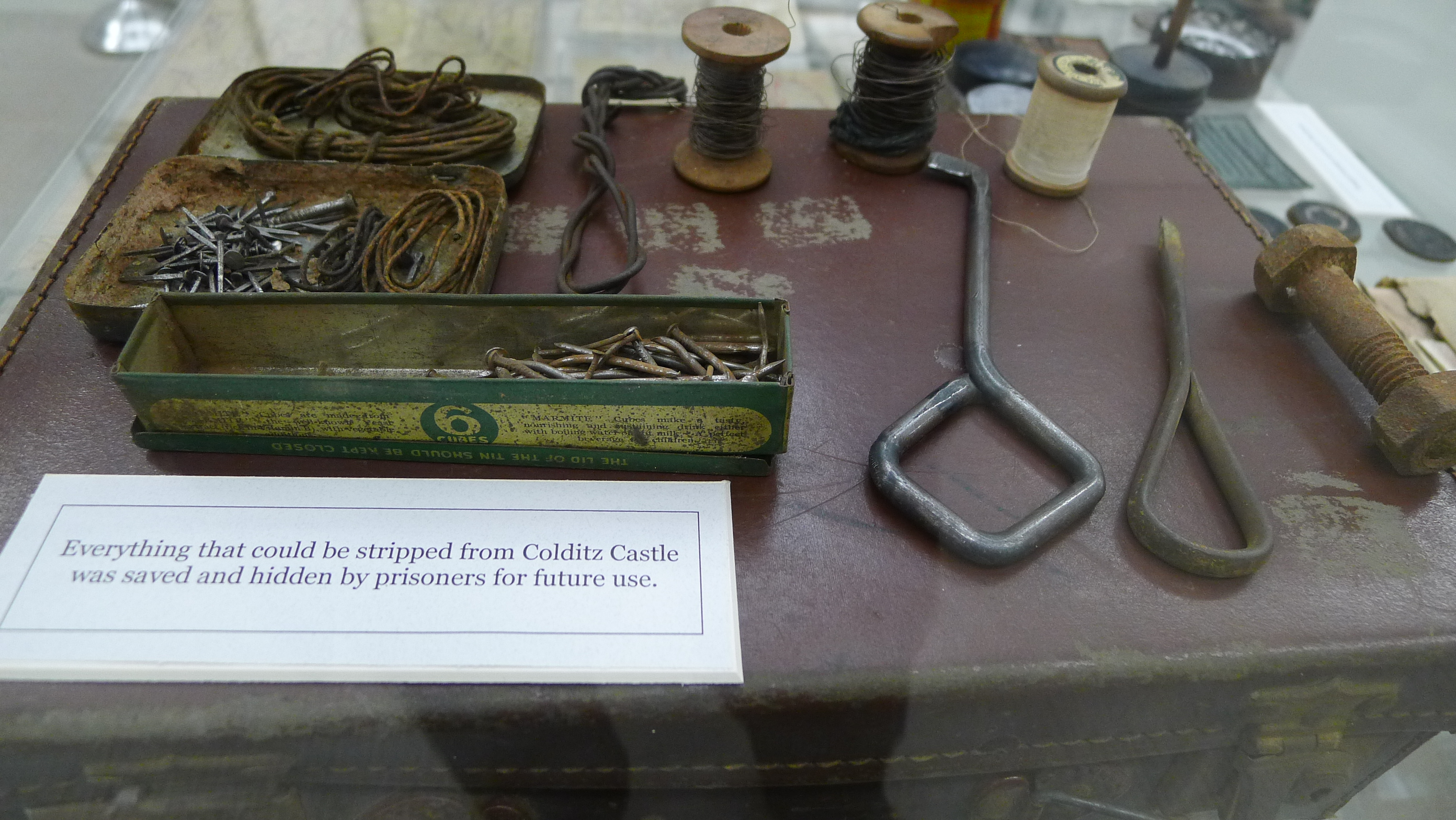
Artifacts at The International Museum of World War II, Massachusetts. A briefcase and tools. Bruce and his comrades secured escape equipment.

In the Evidenz Zimmer (interview room), a German Officer invited many to an open meeting. At the meeting, Jim Rogers scanned a lag crawling along the floor boards. The lag was that serial escaper, Dominic Bruce.

Bruce overloaded the room with inmates. The prisoners overwhelmed the officer. They all chatted away whilst Bruce stole the Aktentasche. This case contained papers. A demanded escaping resource and probably useful when travelling through occupied Europe. Rogers also noted, the exit: Bruce shuffled out with the case, hat and gloves, hidden by the crowd. Rogers explained, this officer reacted to this theft. An Appell was called and the guards lost their composure. Threats were made. Rogers had never seen promises of reprisals at that level.

==== Nicknames ====
In his IWM interview tapes, he tells how he fooled the King's cousin Viscount Lascelles (later the Earl of Harewood, he was being kept in Colditz as a hostage by the SS) into believing that the average or medium size of homo sapiens was 5 feet 3 inches (his own height). When Lascelles told his mess mates about this novel theory it did not take them long to discover who had fooled him. That resulted in his nickname, 'the Medium Sized Man.' Bruce was also known as the 'Medium Sized Officer.'The Germans called him Der Kleine behind his back, or more formally 'Kapitein Brücke' (Captain Bridge') which was the nearest they could come to pronouncing his family name in German. He was also known as 'Brucie' to friends, or simply 'Bruce.'

During his failed escape under the wire at Colditz, he discovered his German nickname, as the guard who fell over him in the dark (and in his fright shot at Bruce, just barely missing his eyebrow) answered the security patrol's question as to who it was by saying 'Der Kleine' ('the little one'). The sentry overcame his shock only to burst out laughing when Bruce shouted "I surrender", in German, in an effort to prevent him shooting again. When he emerged from his six-week sentence in solitary confinement he asked another prisoner, Cyril Lewthwaite, who spoke excellent German, if he could explain the guard's odd reaction. Lewthwaite asked Bruce what he had said in German. Bruce obliged, whereupon Lewthwaite pointed out that "Ich ueber gebe mich" does not in fact mean "I surrender" but "I am going to be sick" (taken from a private letter to Peter Tunstall dated 5 September 1979).

==== Character ====
Notoriously short tempered (his father 'Billie' Bruce was supposed to be the 'worst tempered man in the North of England') he was described as 'as hard as nails' by his fellow Spangenberg inmate, Squadron Leader Eric Foster, in his autobiography. Tunstall explained Bruce was very meticulous, and gave plaudits to him by describing him as having the draw of a big personality. After the Swiss commission escape, Tunstall also claimed that compared to him with his bad ankle, Bruce and Newborn had mental toughness to keep going whilst on the march; and that of the three Bruce, with his stamina, was the pacesetter.

The sapper Jim Rogers, penned a list of his respected prisoners. He called them the Kings of Colditz. Alongside the likes of Sinclair, Bruce was on that list. Rogers reasoned Bruce was an escaper who, "dedicated every waking day to escaping." Rogers (page 121) also described both Bruce's alertness to passing opportunities, and his tendency for taking outrageous risks, giving the example of the time when Bruce crawled along a floor and robbed a visiting German General of his hat, gloves, swagger stick and a briefcase full of useful documents, all of which were photographed and reinserted back into the case, which was relocked and returned within minutes to a now apoplectic General.

Ingenious he may have been, but not all Bruce's escape ideas were successful. The Colditz dentist, Julius Green (in his book From Colditz in Code) tells the story of an escape attempt that was a little too ingenious. Bruce persuaded a friend, Rex Harrison of the Green Howards, who was six feet five inches, to carry him inside his long greatcoat from a series of straps. Rex was to carry a football under his arm, into which Bruce would put his head using a hole cut into the back of the football. The idea was simple. Harrison would exit the castle to go the exercise park below the castle walls with Bruce clinging to his waist. Once in the park, accomplices would create a distraction, Bruce would slip out from under Harrison's coat, and then hide under a pile of leaves. When the guards counted the prisoners as they re-entered the castle, the count would be identical to the number who went out. Unfortunately, while the duo were practising the escape on a staircase, another inmate came rushing down the stairs, crashed into Harrison, and all three went tumbling down the staircase. Bruce reluctantly abandoned the idea.

=== Officer training ===
Training, Bruce studied Bomber theory. He was confident. Bruce talked to the officers about his tactics and strategy. He gave out his well thought out advice to his seniors. Once he attempted to advise his CO. And the Wing Commander with a tone and a curtness had two carefully considered words for the NCO. Bruce later acknowledged the CO was right.

=== Wing Commander Roy Arnold ===
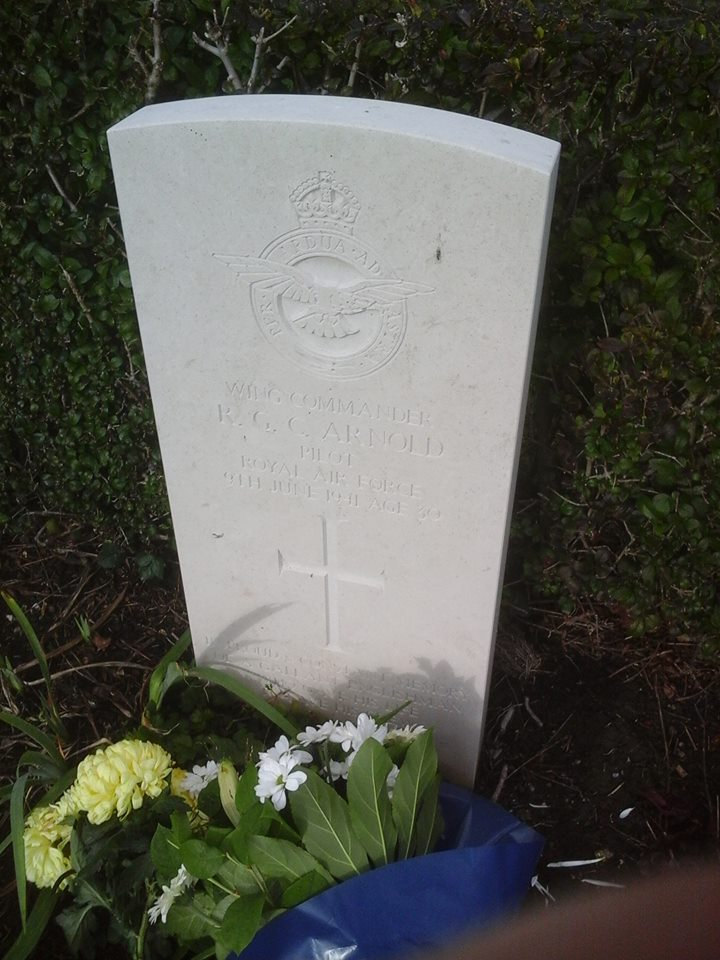
The Blankenberge grave of Wing Commander Roy George Claringbould Arnold MD

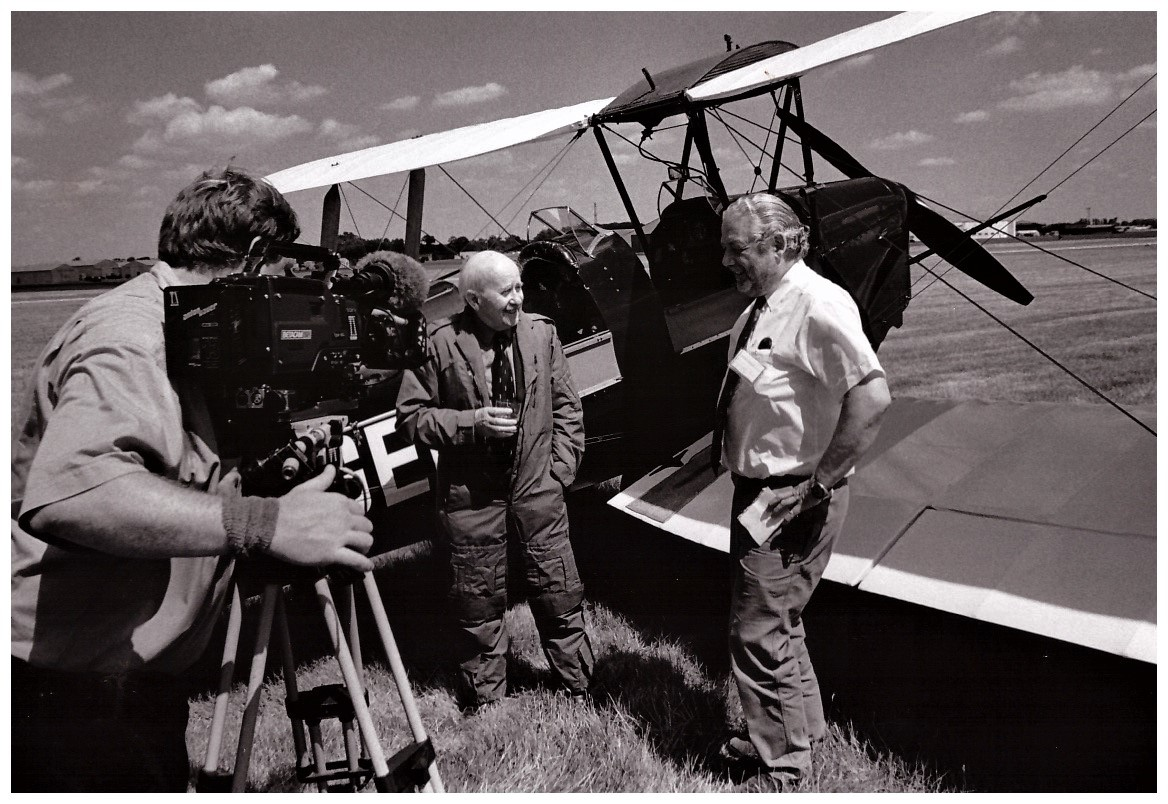
Bruce (middle, in flying suit and Caterpillar Club tie, glass in hand, aged 80) being interviewed by a SKY TV reporter, at RAF Fairford during the RAF 50th Anniversary Victory Airshow in 1995, where he was chosen to represent RAF veterans of 1935.

On 9 June 1941, while navigating a Wellington bomber over the North Sea, on a mission to bomb enemy shipping on the Dutch and Belgium coast, his aircraft was shot down by what was thought to be two Bf 109s. The Bf 109s were first encountered four miles from Calais. Walter "Jap" Schneider claimed shooting down Bruce's Wellington.

Of No. 9 Squadron's four Wellington planes on this operation, only two came back. In total, 18 aircraft took part in this raid.

On this raid, Bruce was part of another scratch crew. The crew included: Bruce, Wing Commander pilot Roy Arnold, air-gunner Flying Officer Thomas Albert Bax, air-gunner Sgt. R. H. Barratt who was also from staff, Sgt. James Murray Pinkham and Sgt. Harold Arthur Wink. Arnold stayed at the controls of the burning Wellington, at low height, in order to keep it steady and allow the other five crew members to escape. He was thirty years old and married. Arnold is buried in the CWG cemetery at Blankenberge, Belgium. The story of his act of self-sacrifice did not emerge until after the war when the crew returned from captivity and could tell their squadron commander. Arnold's bravery was mentioned in dispatches.

==== Zeebrugge capture and Caterpillar Club ====
In the Second World War, the survival rates for bailing out into the sea were not great with roughly one third surviving and despite the fact that he could not swim, Bruce, with at least air-gunner Thomas Bax, baled out into the sea, hoping that the current would take him south towards France and the resistance life lines that had been established there. However, motor launches were quickly despatched from the port and he was picked by the German Navy in the sea near Zeebrugge. He earned membership of the "Caterpillar Club" as a result of this exit from a "disabled aircraft" as can be seen from his wearing of the Club tie in the photo taken in 1995 at RAF Fairford (right). (Note: The Caterpillar Club is an informal association. The only requirement to join is that you used a parachute when jumping from a stricken aircraft. In his career, documents show Bruce qualified not just in 1941, but in 1938.) He was also a member of the Goldfish Club for those who parachuted into water.

Bruce would later write, "This was a silly daylight raid... with no escort against enemy fighters." He suffered burns. He was sent to Dulag Luft, then immediately sent to Hohemark for treatment for burns.

==== Presumed KIA ====
At first, it was thought that all the crew had died as a result of their Wellington being shot down. After two weeks without news, the International Red Cross sent a message to his wife, Mary Lagan Bruce, that her husband was alive. In recordings, now lodged in the Oral History Sound Archive of the British Library, she tells how that she had been utterly convinced that he was alive, despite all the evidence to the contrary.

=== Spangenberg Castle ===
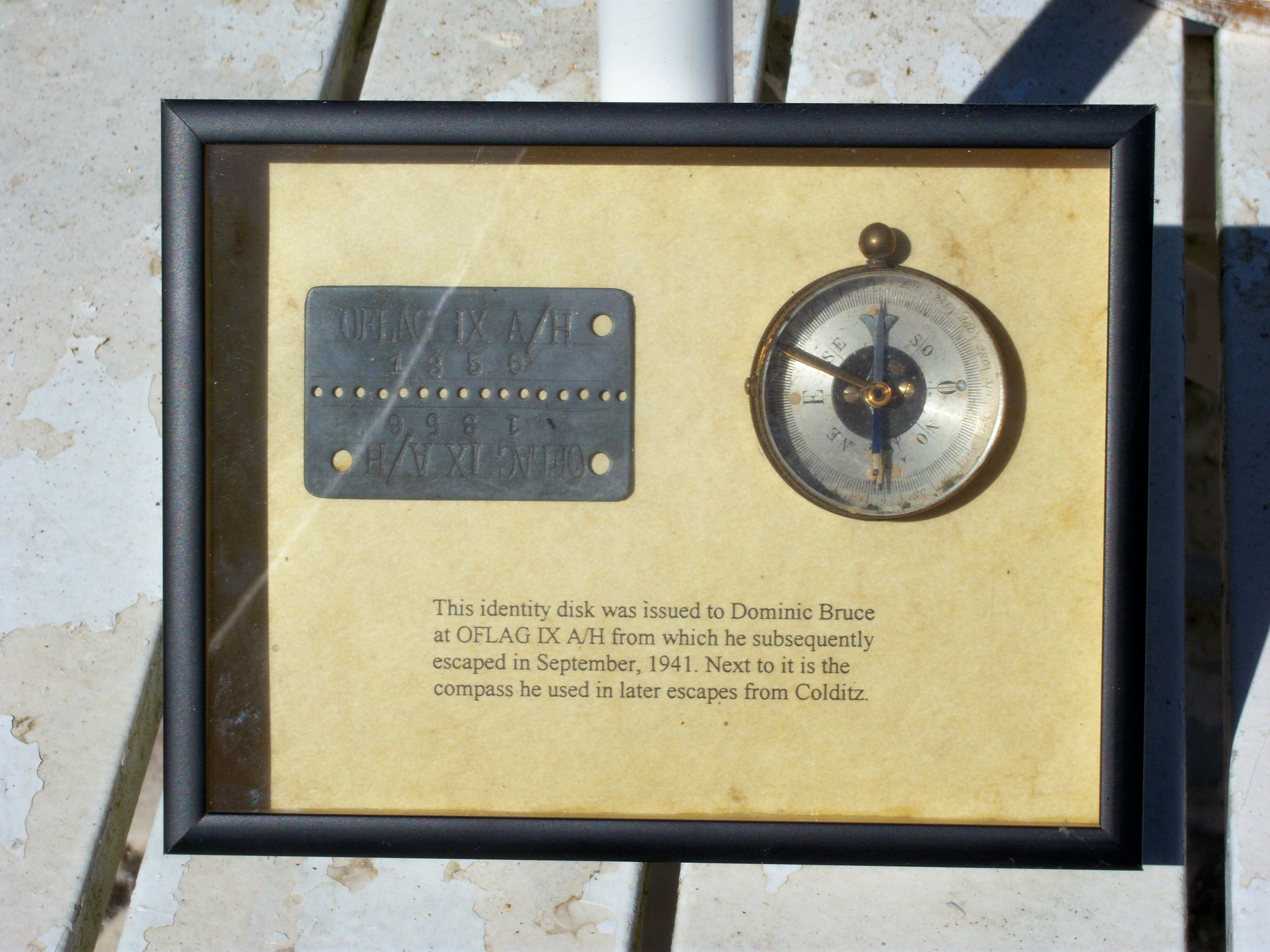
The perforated German Government copper identity tag issued to Bruce at Spangenberg (on his death it would have been broken in half); and the compass he used after escaping from Colditz to find his way through Germany to freedom.

On 23 June 1941, Bruce was sent to Oflag IX-A/H, a German prisoner-of-war camp at Spangenberg Castle. Spangenberg Castle (German: Schloss Spangenberg) is a schloss above the small German town of Spangenberg in the North Hesse county of Schwalm-Eder-Kreis.

Upon arrival, Bruce was also awaiting trial after being involved with an altercation with an overzealous guard in Dulag Luft. Inside the castle, he would be joined by the injured No. 9 Squadron air gunner Thomas Albert Bax. His other surviving No. 9 Squadron comrades were sent to other POW camps.

Inside the castle, Bruce would meet persistent want-to-be escapees like Eric Foster, Joe Barker, Eustace Newborn and Pete Tunstall. Tunstall once stated about the Schloss, "the castle had earned a reputation as escape-proof of all German POW centres of the Second World War." Tunstall also explained that the dry moat in the castle had been available to POWs as an exercise yard, but after a couple of escape attempts, this privilege had been withdrawn and that to discourage the slightest thought of escaping, the guards had even placed savage wild boars with sharp tusks to live inside the moat.

==== Innovator of the wooden horse technique ====
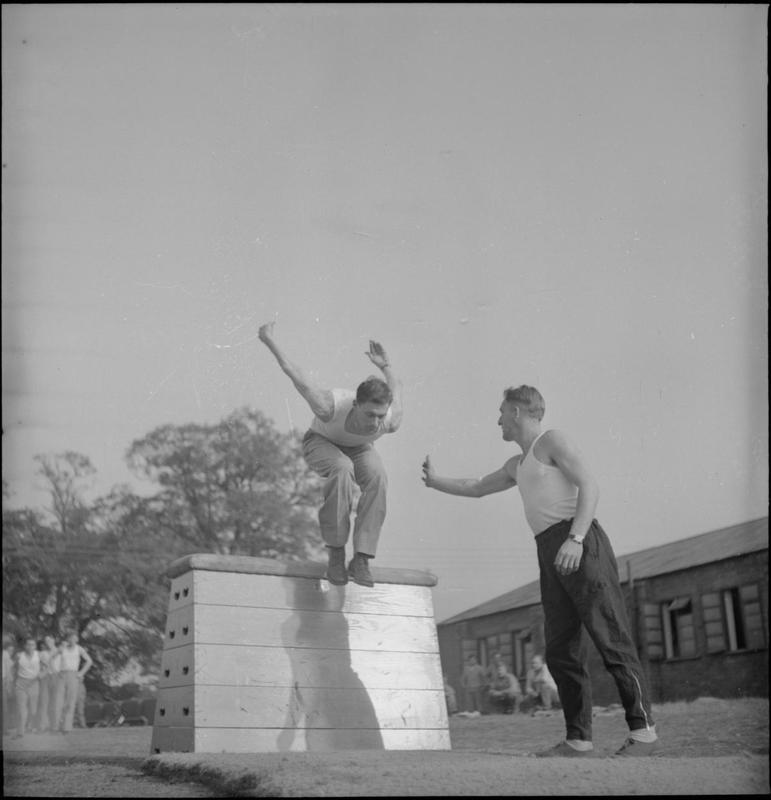
A "wooden horse", as seen in a US Army rehabilitation centre; UK, 1943.

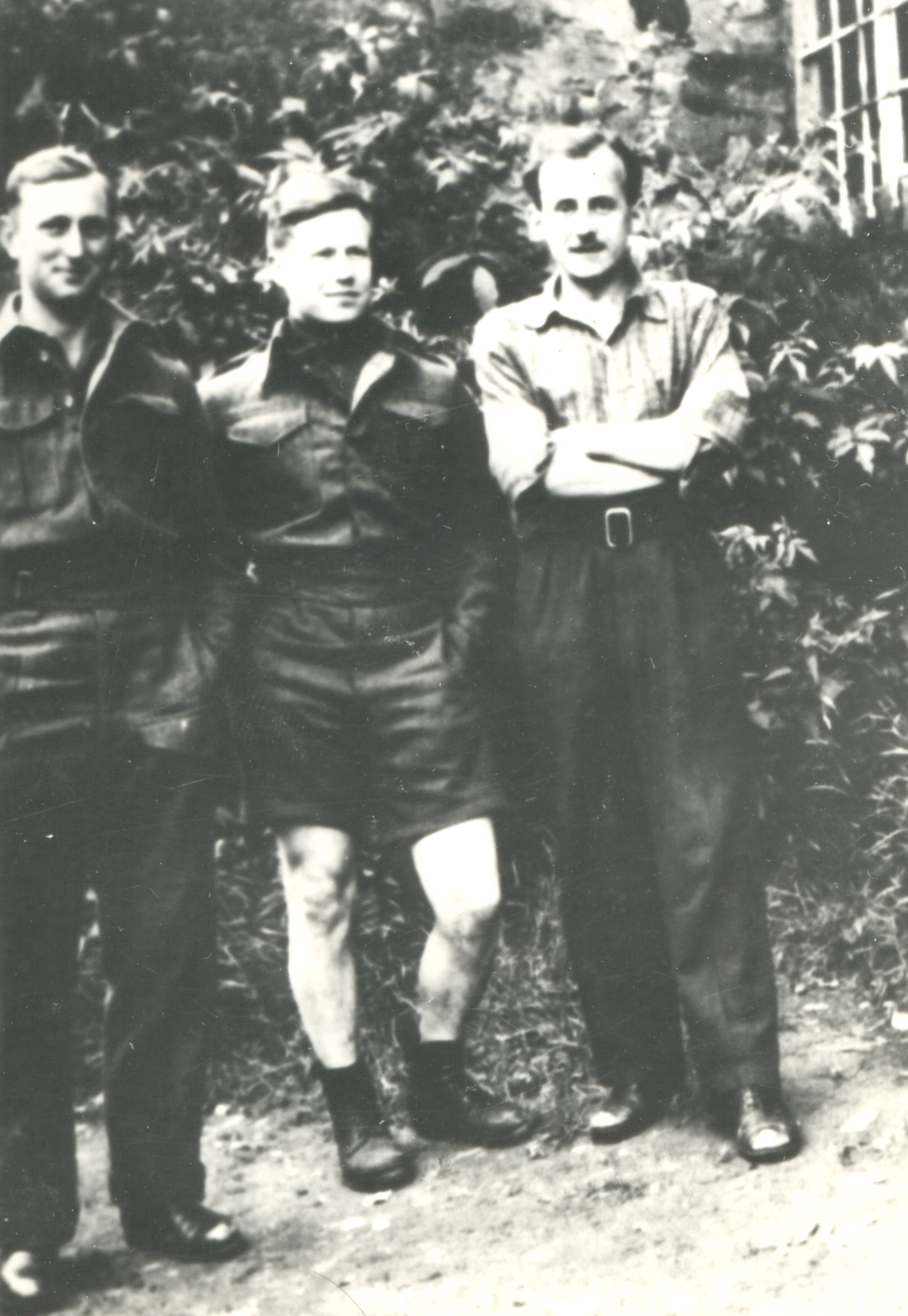
Bruce (on right) during his imprisonment in Spangenberg

It has been argued that Bruce and Tunstall are the original innovators of the wooden horse escape technique. Along with Eustace Newborn and Peter Tunstall, Bruce came up with the escape plan now known as "the Swiss Red Cross Commission." Tunstall, also highlights that in 1941, prior to him and Bruce planning an escape with the famed 'Swiss Red Cross Commission,' he and Bruce had been digging an escape route with a wooden horse tunnel from inside the gymnasium, the wooden horse was placed roughly four feet from the wall that separated the gym from the moat. The digging was a very slow process, it required the removal of spoil, bricks and stone work, and was aided by other prisoners distracting the guards. They were later joined by Douglas 'Sammy' Hoare and a syndicate who were promised a second go if they escaped undiscovered. Other members of this syndicate were also named as: Harry Bewlay, John Milner and Eustace Newborn.

When Bruce and Tunstall noted the slow process, they began examining the rest of the castle and left the digging to the other team involving Sammy Hoare. The tunnel almost reached completion but unfortunately the digging team got caught when a guard become suspicious at the large stones that were accumulating outside of the gym. The guard then called a search, and then found the escape tunnel. When the guards found the shaft they called an Appell and Hauptmann Schmidt confidently stated to the prisoners, "It is impossible to escape by tunnel or any other way."

This wooden horse gym escape tunnel was two years prior to the famed Sagan wooden horse escape. Tunstall stated that he would like to think some of the watchers and workers who helped on their original wooden horse escape may have mentioned it from time to time; and would like to think that their idea contributed to the success of the effort at Sagan.

==== Swiss Red Cross Commission escape ====
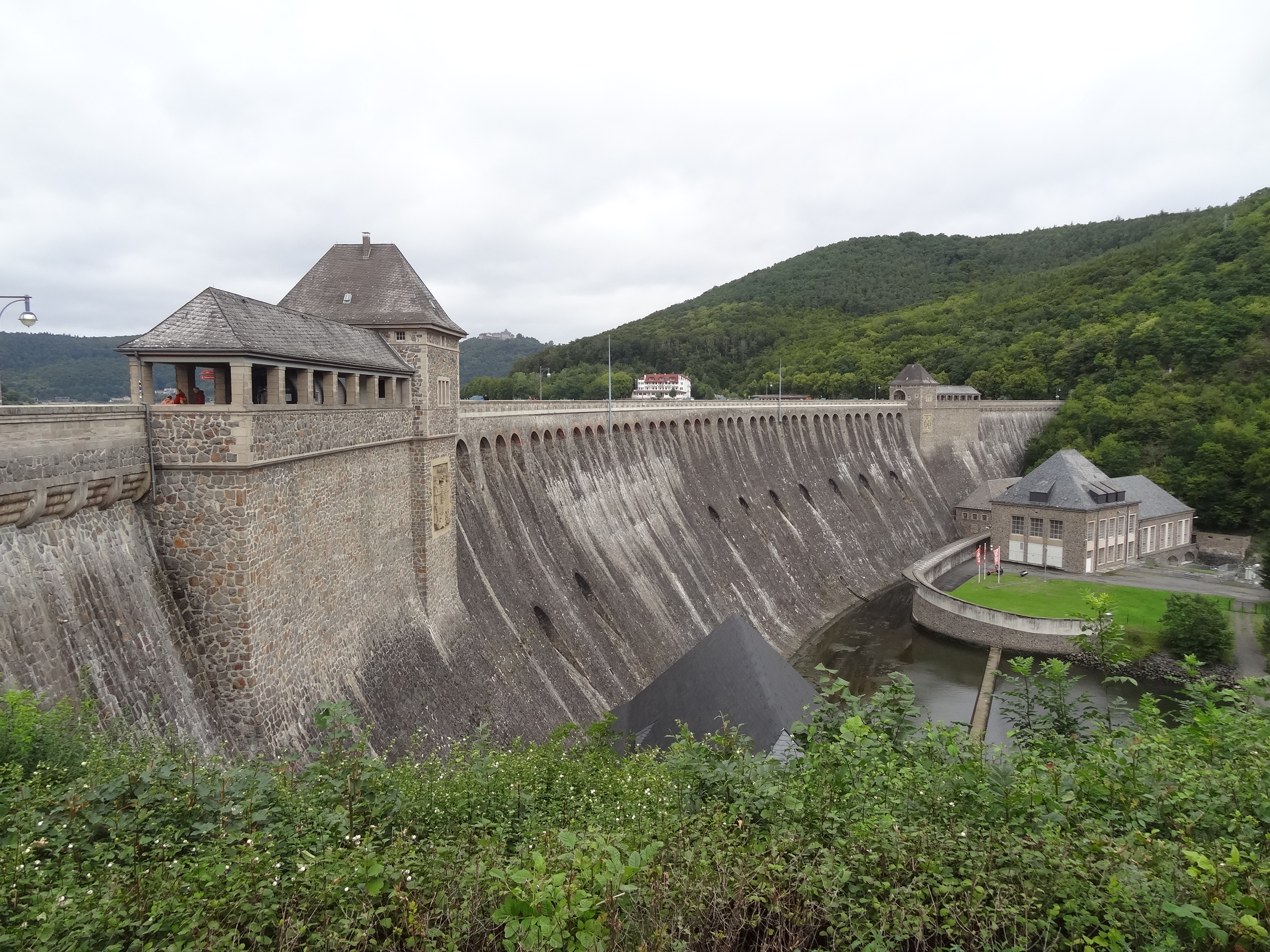
The Edersee Dam, 2015. A Dam Busters connection. In September 1941, the three Spangenberg escapers marched past the dam. The dam was breached during Operation Chastise, on 17 May 1943.

The 'Swiss Red Cross Commission' has been described as the most audacious escape of World War II. Bruce's MC citation described it as a very clever escape. In late July and early August 1941, Bruce, Newborn and Tunstall took an interest in the architecture of the building and broke into a flat in the Schloss belonging to a forestry principal. Inside the flat the trio obtained escape material such as disguises, maps and a compass. After sourcing the escape resources, they carefully crafted an escape that involved the gate security of the castle, with the eventual aim being after escaping the castle, to break into Kassel airfield and then fly to Basel on a stolen aircraft. After carefully planning and waiting many weeks for the conditions to be just right, on 3 September 1941, the trio brazenly walked across the moat bridge. The three POWs simply walked out of the camp posing as a German officer (Tunstall) and two doctors (Bruce and Newborn) of a Swiss Red Cross inspection team. Upon reaching the bottom of the hill outside the castle's grounds, they quickly removed their Swiss Commission disguises and then made their way to Kassel, a strong Nazi military centre, dressed as Luftwaffe airmen, aiming to steal a plane.

Eventually, after a turn of unfortunate events, they were forced to change their plans and the three decided to march onwards towards the Belgium border. After ten days on the run, they were recaptured by an off-duty guard. Following their capture, Bruce, Newborn and Tunstall were interrogated by the Gestapo and sentenced to 53 days in solitude. The escape and the fact that Bruce defied his solitary confinement would put Bruce in serious legal peril with the German military authorities.

==== Solitary confinement ====
After being recaptured following the Swiss Red Cross Commission escape, they were then sent back to Spangenberg. Hauptmann Schmidt was incensed at the audacity of the escape. The three were each held to a long period in solitary confinement. Bruce received 53 days in solitude for the Spangenberg Castle escape, which was longer than the Geneva convention suggested. In Spangenberg, they were not sentenced for their escape but held in preventative arrest. The Senior British Officer also complained that according to the Geneva convention guidelines, the exercise yard in Spangenberg was too small, and they needed to be moved to another camp.

===== Defying solitude with a card school =====
In solitary confinement, Bruce, Newborn and Tunstall were placed in three separate cells in front of, and high above, the moat they had previously escaped from. The approach by C company to Bruce, Newborn and Tunstall was different to A and B company. When compared to C company, A and B company treat Bruce, Newborn and Tunstall with good humour. To the amusement of Bruce, Newborn, and Tunstall, in the remaining cell, Blockhead was also doing his time in confinement for letting the fake inspection team through the gate. Whilst they were held in confinement, they even managed to defy solitude after Bruce picked the lock on his, Newborn's and Tunstall's cell doors in order that they might join him in his cell to play poker with a set of home made cards a previous occupant had left behind. When caught out by the guard who had noted that there was three to a cell, Tunstall claimed, Bruce, Newborn and himself smiled and nodded at the puzzled and curious guard as if they were innocent, this was harmless, and as if the guard was a juvenile who had just completed a simple comprehension test. The guard upon realising they had the nerve to break the solitary punishment, then blew his top. For the breaking of the solitude, Bruce was eventually court-martialled on the serious military charge of breaking free from arrest, the other two eventually got 5 extra days solitude. Tunstall explained he thought Bruce eventually got away with it by Bruce explaining escaping was not a court-martial offence for a POW, according to the Geneva Convention. Inside of solitary, Tunstall claims, early on, there were rumours of Bruce, Tunstall and Newborn being shot. After nearly eight weeks, the whole camp was made to move; Bruce, Tunstall and Newborn were rumoured to be, and expected to be, sent straight to the Colditz Straflager (punishment camp), instead, they were sent to Warburg. This immediate move was a hindrance to Bruce and Tunstall as they had been formulating two more escape plans. Tunstall mentions that on the journey to Warburg there was a flurry of train jumpers.

=== Warburg prisoner of war camp ===
After his Spangenberg Castle escape, Bruce was eventually sent to Oflag VI-B, then in the village of Dössel (now in Warburg). The Warburg camp has been described as soulless, bleak and unfinished. It housed roughly 3,000 prisoners. The winter in Europe, whilst Bruce was held in Dössel, would be the coldest of the 20th century.

==== Working party escape ====
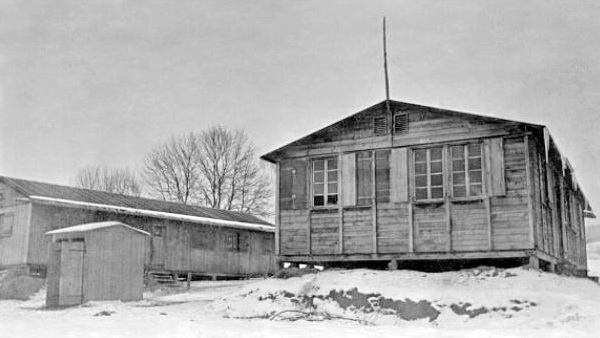
POW camp barracks in WW2. In the Warburg POW Camp it also snowed, heavily. The snow disrupted escape attempts.

Upon arrival Bruce and Tunstall immediately cased the joint and formulated escape plans. They noticed the secondary gate was used occasionally to march out guarded working parties of orderlies and that the security here was lax, when compared to Spangenberg. Bruce and Tunstall then concocted their first plan, involving walking out of the camp dressed as guards. Bruce and Tunstall then registered their new plan of escape with the Warburg escape committee. They then began working on German Army uniforms to walk out through the lax security. They soon faced two problems: the first was that they were immediately put back into solitary, the next was that the escape committee changed the plan.

Their previous preventative arrest in Spangenberg amounted to almost two months, and despite the fact they had been promised that their arrest time in Spangenberg would count against any sentence in Warburg, a Major named Rademacher announced to Bruce, Tunstall and Newborn that they each would be serving 28 days in solitary. This was the first immediate blow to Bruce's and Tunstall's first escape plan. The second blow occurred when the escape committee decided to adjust the plan as they wanted it to accommodate more prisoners. The committee's new plan was to use the uniforms and the forged papers and then march out a big, bogus, working party. Bruce and Tunstall were to be orderlies in the plan and the uniforms were to be worn by two fluent German speakers. One of the guards was called Peter Stevens MC who was a fluent German speaker; and the other guard of the orderlies was called Lance Pope who also spoke good German. Tunstall explains how he and Bruce accepted the change selflessly but were worried that the changes were too ambitious and would complicate things. Still, the escape committee worked on the uniforms, dummy rifles and the documents which were forged by John Mansel, whom Tunstall described as being the master forger of WW2.

The first two times the worker party escape was tried, it was held back at the gates due to faults in the documentation. In January 1942, the third time they attempted the bogus worker party, they forged the signature of the guard Feldwebel Braun. This opened the gate. Though this escape was immediately hindered by the guardsman noticing, Feldwebel Braun could not have signed the papers as he was on compassionate leave. The guards then started firing, and the bogus workers party dispersed. According to Tunstall, not one of the escape party was caught and the German uniforms, the dummy rifles and forged papers where quickly stowed away in the hides at emergency speed. The German search party did however find a piece of green cloth which was used to make the German uniform, on the camp's belongings. Bruce and Tunstall were blamed for this by Major Rademacher. For this action Bruce received more time in solitary confinement.

==== Wrath of a guard ====
POWs thought of Rademacher as a sadist. A man on a power quest. Someone who could turn. Known for his unannounced 'bastard searches', he would chuck possessions out into the snow. He gained notoriety for his incitement. Once encouraging a rifle butt to the head of a senior officer. The conscripted, the anti-Nazi and apolitical guards, pained at his behaviour. Some were apologetic.

He was a keen reader of prisoners case sheets. The literature highlights Rademacher sought Bruce and his comrades out on arrival. He had needless prejudices for Bruce and the lags. Major Rademacher liked placing them in the cooler for extended stretches. And no authority recommended these unlawful stretches. With regards to the abuse of power, Rademacher once stated to Bruce and his comrades: “I am not responsible for the promises of fools...”

===== February 1942 =====
External image
- Sneaking out letters was dangerous. Espionage carried the possibility of execution.

In February 1942 Bruce had legal problems. Correspondence and papers between the Air ministry, the Red Cross and the Divisional Court, show this. On the 15 February 1942, a sneaked out letter, by Tunstall and Bader tricked the postal censor. The letter highlighted Bruce received more solitary confinement than usual; and more confinement was penciled in for a future date. It explained the guards see Bruce and the lads as desperadoes, implying criminality. It suggested the guards made a needless furore. The harassment, usurped the requested peace. Trumped up charges were fitted up against Dominic Bruce, Peter Tunstall and the lads.

==== Escaping from solitary confinement ====
Bruce and Tunstall were sent to solitary confinement for the attempted escape with a workers party and were each given three months. They felt persecuted by Rademacher as they perceived the Major was always putting them into confinement for baseless reasons.

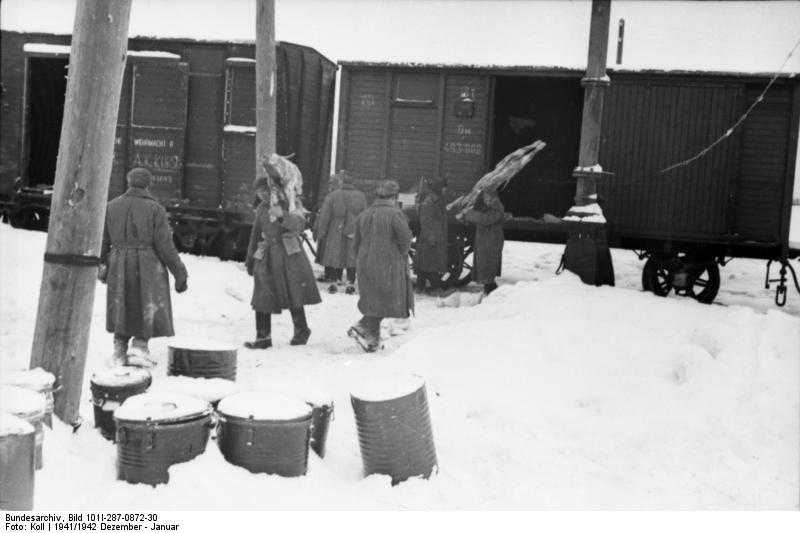
For one escape, Bruce and Tunstall planned to break free and then jump trains at Dössel. The harsh weather prevented this.

Whilst in solitary confinement, they still concocted more escape plans. During this specific stretch of confinement, they worked out one more plan, and this set-up involved an actual escape from inside the solitary confinement block. They wanted to break out of the camp and follow a previous route to France which was attempted by a former prisoner who had jumped on a goods train in Dössel and had evaded capture for five days. They also noted the cell block was made of a heavy timber, and that to escape from the camp with this type of timber required adequate tools. With this in mind, they then handmade a selection of tools and wrapped them up. Bruce eventually hid the tools in the wood shavings in his mattress.

Knowing the tools were now safe, they could pick their moment. On the morning of their planned escape, they noticed more snow had fallen. They observed that this was not escaping weather and they had no option but to wait for better weather. Sadly for Bruce and Tunstall, this wait was prolonged and, whilst waiting for the weather conditions to improve, Bruce and Tunstall were ordered to pack their belongings... and they were then sent to Colditz. A year later, inside Colditz, former Warburg prisoner Douglas Bader, explained the escape tools they left inside Warburg had been successfully used by another prisoner.

=== Prisoner at Colditz ===
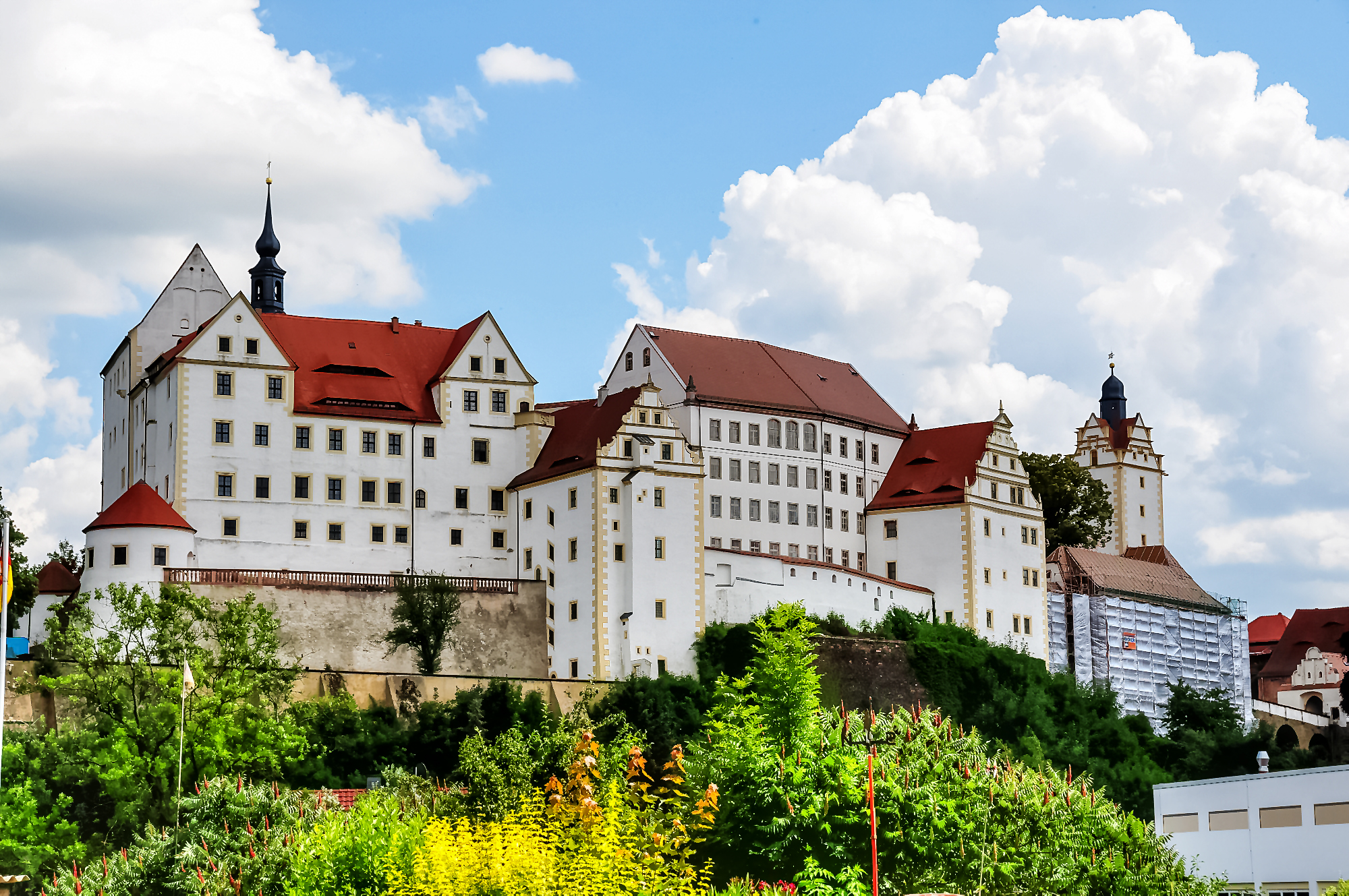
Colditz Castle as seen in 2011

Bruce arrived in Colditz Castle, known as officer prisoner-of-war camp Oflag IV-C, on 16 March 1942. Colditz was near Leipzig in the State of Saxony. It was intended to contain Allied officers who had escaped many times from other prisoner-of-war camps and were deemed incorrigible. It was the only POW camp with more guards than prisoners. The Nazis regarded it as the most escape proof prison in Germany. Colditz, because of the escapee prisoners it housed, eventually become thought of as an international escape academy. Heavily guarded Colditz, still managed more home runs than anywhere else.

==== Arrival, processing and court-martial ====
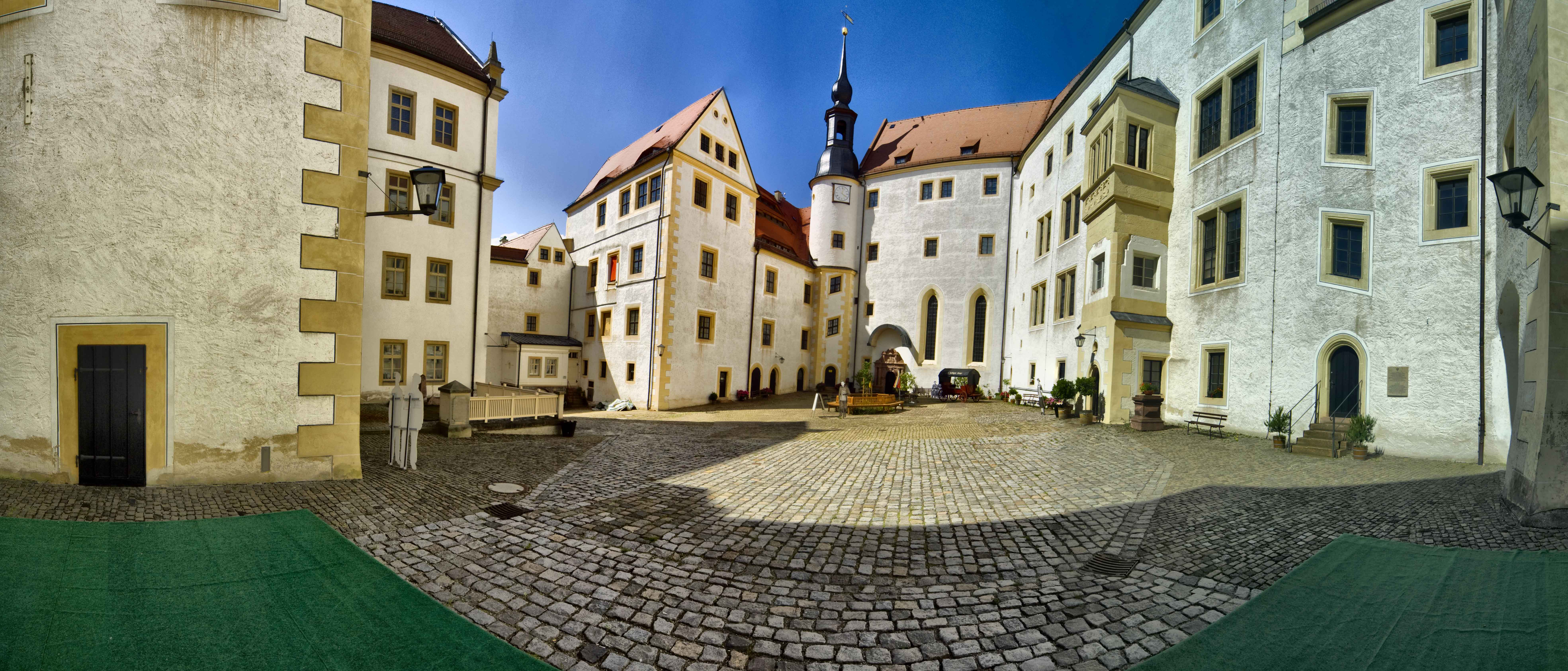
Prisoners yard as seen in 2011.

On the train journey to Colditz, they had been escorted to Colditz by three privates and one NCO. These guards were in turn briefed about Bruce's and Tunstall's propensity for escaping; the guards were under a threat of severe retribution if they ever escaped. The guards called Colditz Sonderlager (Special Camp) and the prisoners called Colditz Straflager (Punishment Camp). When Bruce arrived at Colditz late at night and, for the first time, entered the deserted, flood lit exercise yard, on his way to the upper cells, Tunstall recollects that Bruce's first words were, "We'll get out of this bloody place too." To which Tunstall recalls he replied, "You bet."

External videos
- Criminalised. Harassed. Court-martialled. The cooler. On arrival, they dispatched Bruce and Tunstall to the upper cells. The same cells two Poles Mikołaj Surmanowicz and Mieczysław Chmiel, escaped from with bed sheets. The cells had barred windows and the highest security.

Upon arrival Bruce was given the prisoner number 1356. After recapture from his Spangenberg and Warburg escapes, Bruce, now in Colditz, was put in a cell whilst waiting for trial. Bruce was facing a court-martial. He was charged with breaking and entering for picking a lock in a walled off part of the Spangenberg Castle; and theft of the uniform he found in the walled off room inside Spangenberg Castle; the documents also show, he was put into solitary confinement in Spangenberg Castle, and allege, Bruce kicked the cell door down whilst in his cell. The alleged action of kicking the cell door down, added a very serious charge of sabotage of state property. Tunstall description of the events, differs to Bruce's charge sheet, it highlighted that no state property was broken and Bruce, Newborn and Tunstall were defying solitude after Bruce picked the locks in their solitary confinement. In WWII it was generally accepted that the main rules of escaping were: don't wear German uniform; don't use violence; and don't engage in espionage or sabotage. It was perceived that breaking these rules could result in the prisoner facing a court-martial, and even death. Bruce was clearly in trouble with regards to his charge sheet in that he had stolen a German uniform and had been charged with an alleged sabotage of state property. The sabotage of state property being a very serious charge.

To defend himself, Bruce choose a fellow Colditz prisoner, Lieutenant Alan Campbell, a trained lawyer, to advocate for him. Campbell (subsequently Baron Campbell of Alloway ERD QC (24 May 1917 – 30 June 2013)) argued that, according to King's Regulations, Bruce had a duty to escape; and using a precedent, cited a case of a German fighter pilot called Franz von Werra who had escaped, von Werra who was famed for getting the German High Command to change its policy with regards to POW's; and highlighted the fact that Bruce had never used violence. After the trial, Bruce received a moderate sentence of three months in solitary. Alan Campbell's case notes, which also include 41 other cases, are now held in the archives of the Imperial War Museum.

On 21 April 1942, Bruce's commission was confirmed and he was promoted to the war substantive rank of flying officer.

Within six months, Bruce escaped the castle grounds with the tea chest escape.

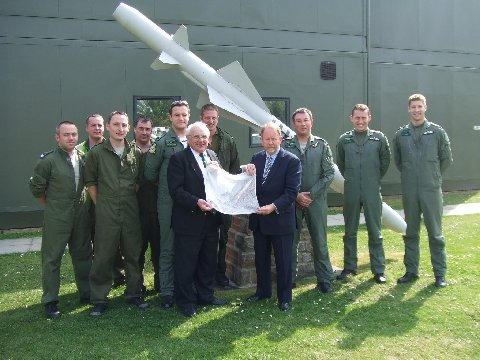
The silk map was donated to a RAF museum.

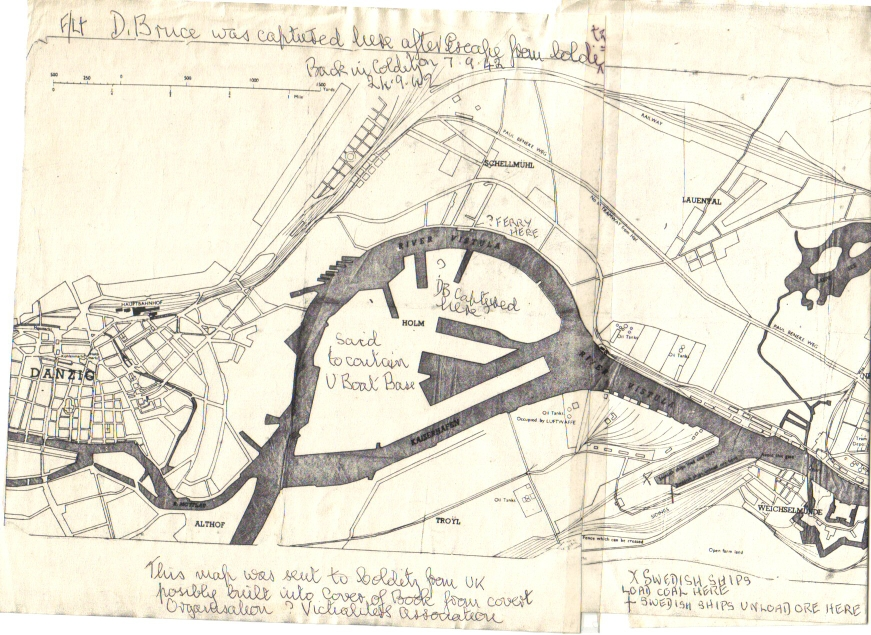
An annotated copy of a map of Danzig sent by MI9 (hidden in a book cover) to Colditz, and subsequently used by Dominic Bruce in the 'Tea Chest' escape

==== Tea chest escape ====
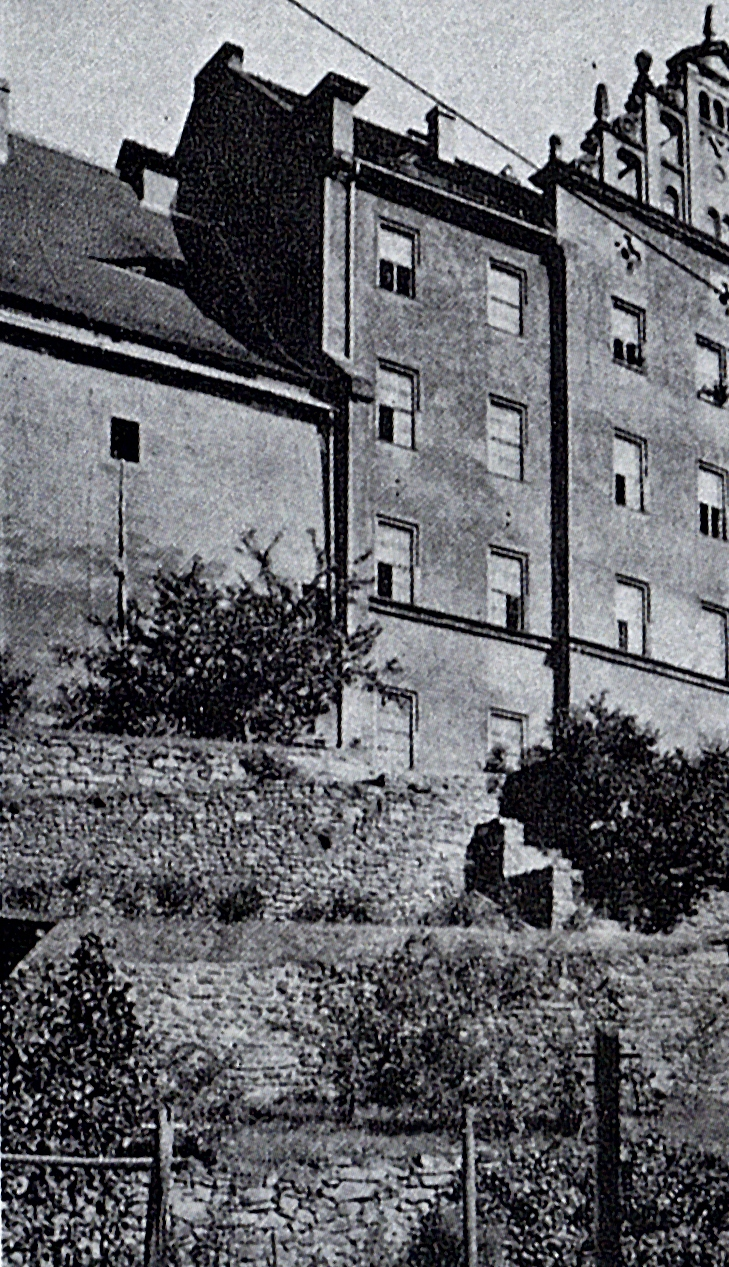
Photo of the bed sheet rope used in the 'tea chest' escape from Colditz by Dominic Bruce.

Bruce was the author of the famed "Tea Chest Escape" which was featured in the Imperial War Museum's 'Great Escapes' exhibition in 2004, where the museum built a facsimile of the tea chest and invited children to see if they could 'escape from Colditz'.

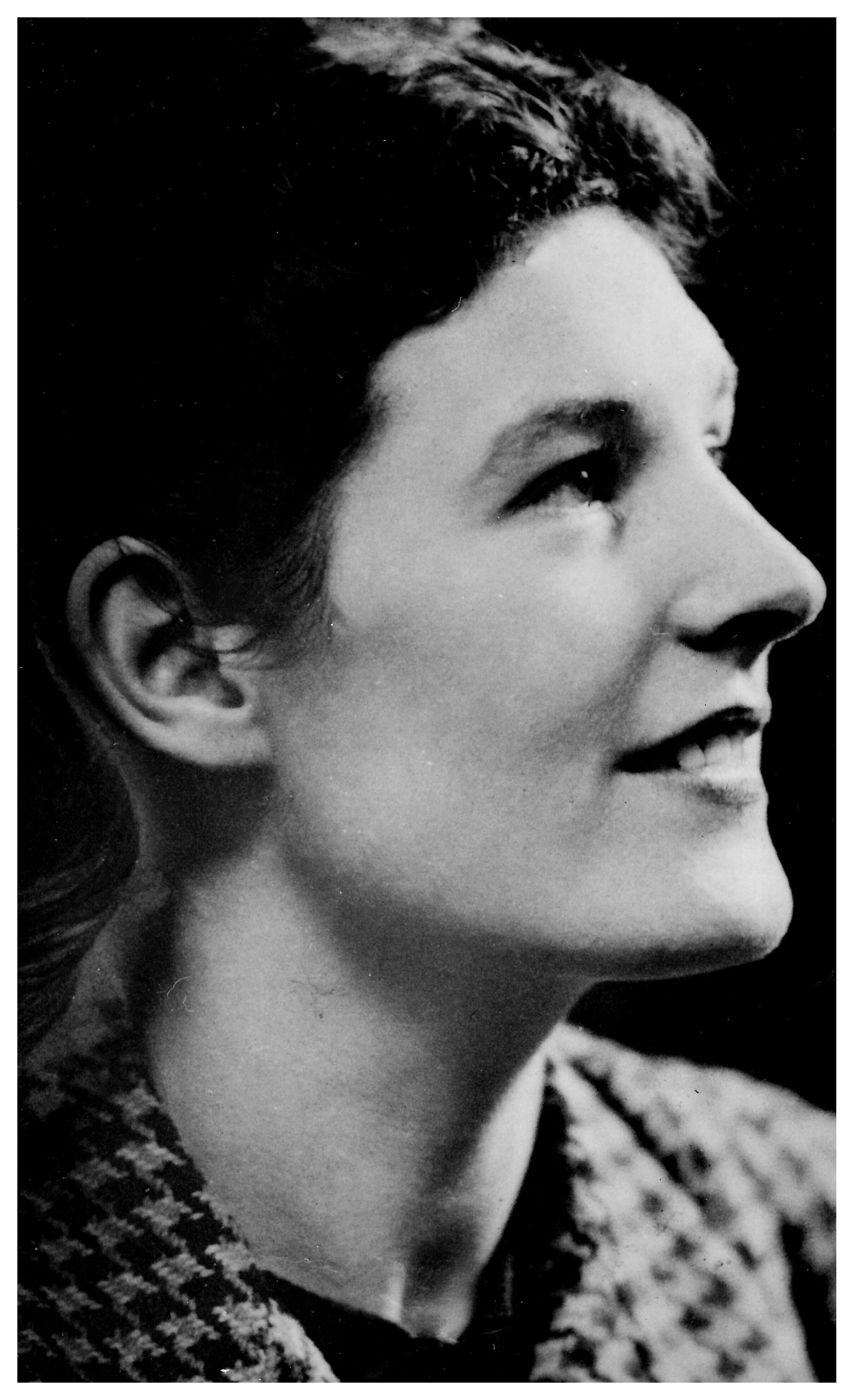
A photo of Bruce's wife, Mary Lagan Bruce, sent to Bruce after his Zeebrugge capture in 1941. Bruce's wife also sent Bruce the silk escaping map which he used to travel to Danzig.

He made use of a silk map. The silk escaping map Bruce used in the escape to guide him to Danzig (now Gdansk) which was sent to him by his wife concealed in a brass button of a uniform, at the behest of MI9, can be seen in the IX Squadron archive museum at RAF Lossiemouth, donated to the Squadron in a handover ceremony by the Bruce family. Because of his very small stature, Bruce was known ironically as the "medium-sized man" (see camaraderie with messmates section for the origin). When a new Commandant arrived at Colditz in the summer of 1942, he enforced rules restricting prisoners' personal belongings. On 8 September 1942, POWs were told to pack up all their excess belongings and an assortment of boxes were delivered to carry them into store. Bruce immediately seized his chance and was packed inside a Red Cross packing case, three-foot square, with just a file and a 40-foot (12 m) length of rope made from bed sheets. Bruce was taken to a storeroom on the third floor of the German Kommandantur and that night, made his escape.

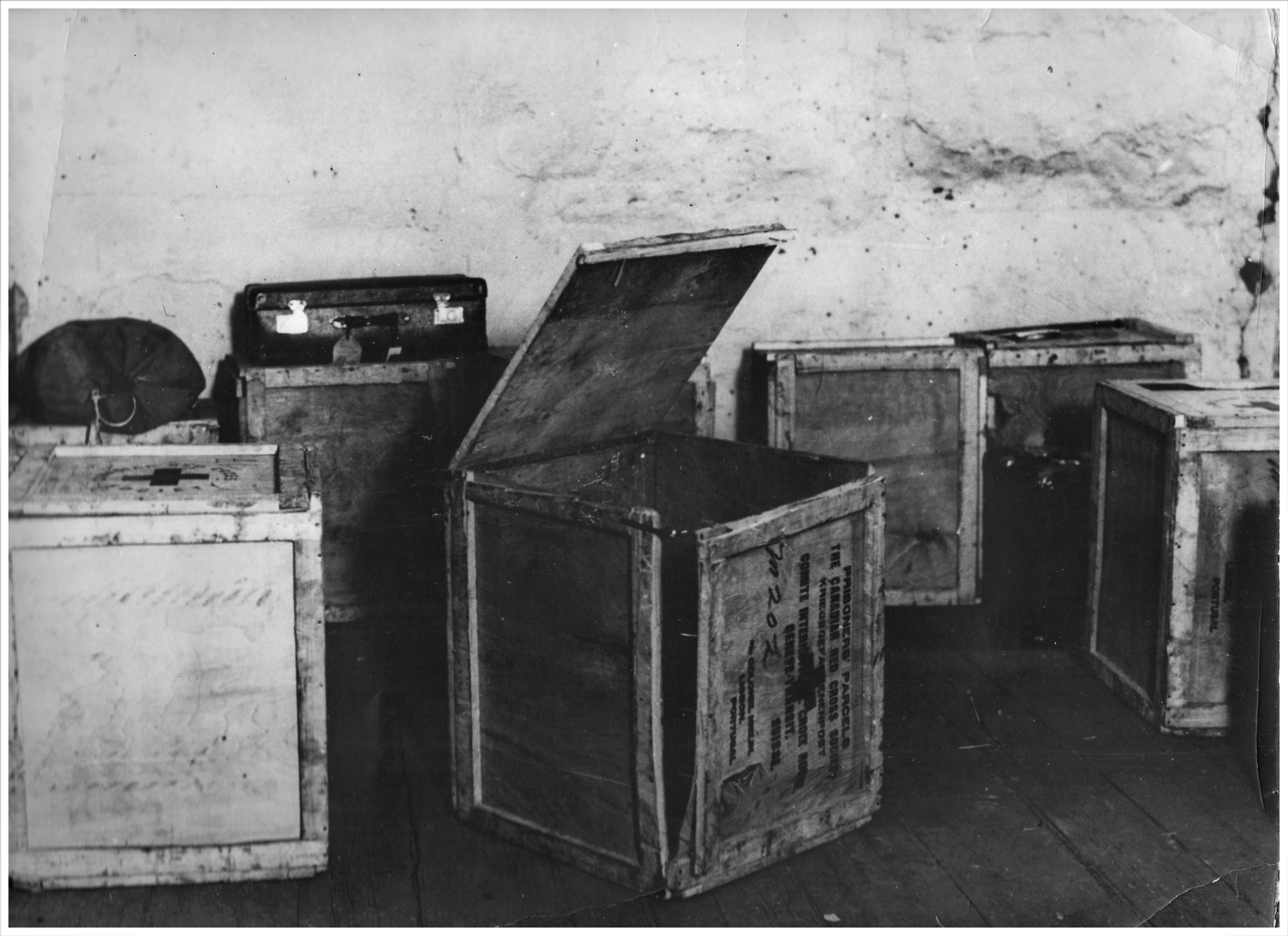
The tea chest used by Bruce to escape from Colditz

The next morning the castle was visited by General Wolff, officer in charge of POW army district 4. He inspected the camp and found everything to his satisfaction. Fortunately for the camp commandant, as Wolff was driven away, his back was turned to the southern face of the castle. If he had turned his head, he would have seen a length of blue and white checked (bedsack) rope dangling from a remote window. It was, however, eventually noticed by a hausfrau (housewife) in the town, who quickly reported it to the duty officer. The guard Georg Martin Schädlich documented how they were suddenly alerted to a rope at 11:30am from one of the attic windows. When the German guards entered the storeroom, they found the empty box on which Bruce had, in yet another of his pranks, inscribed in chalk:

"Die Luft in Colditz gefällt mir nicht mehr. Auf Wiedersehen!"

— Dominic Bruce

Translated this means: "The air in Colditz no longer agrees with me. See you later!" Pat Reid explained it was almost tempting providence of Bruce to write Auf Wiedersehen on the box instead of writing good bye.

In his notes, the guard Schädlich then describes that because of this rope they instantly brought forward an Appell. With the purpose of this Appell being to find out who had escaped.Schädlich described how they had to find Bruce's name from the card index; and how they were duped two times at roll call, thus giving Bruce extra time to travel without a search squad looking for him. He suspected this duping could only have happened because a Frenchman from room 311 had used a false key and slipped into the English sick bay. Whereby this Frenchman then got counted twice, once at the British roll call and once at French roll call. The guard Schädlich also noted Bruce got through the tannery and had an easy escape route as the church square was only five minutes away from this point.

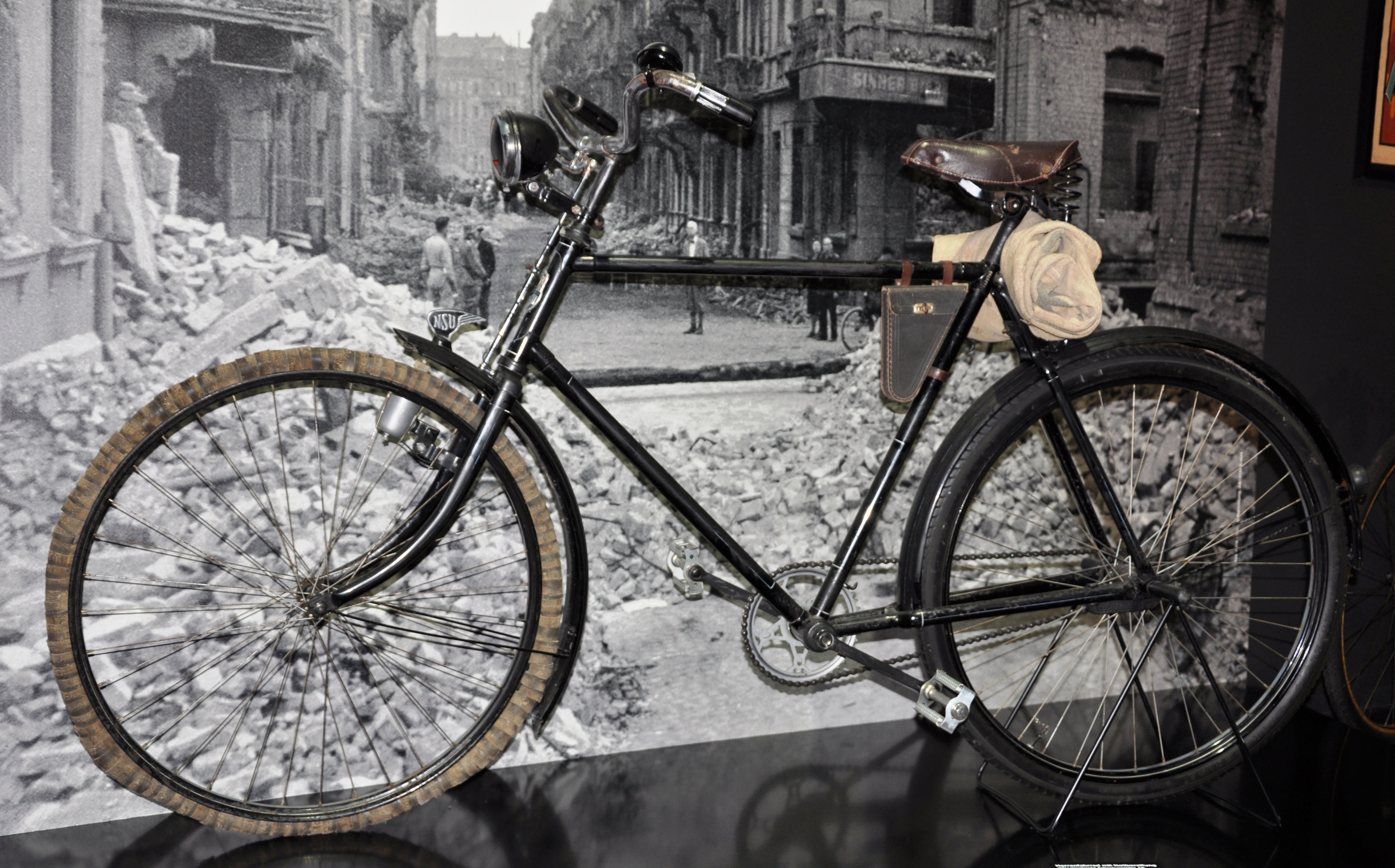
A bicycle from WWII. Bruce stole bicycles to get to Danzig.

Bruce travelled 400 miles to Danzig; the furthest distance he ever made in all his escapes. To get to Danzig, he slept rough, and he travelled by bicycles which he stole from outside village churches during Mass. Whilst travelling to Danzig, Bruce was temporarily recaptured in Frankfurt-on-Oder, but escaped prior to interrogation. In Danzig, one week later, he was eventually caught trying to stow away on a Swedish Freighter. He used a map of Danzig (see photo, annotated in Bruce's own hand) which had been sent by MI9, but didn't realise that the area he attempted to penetrate in order to rest up in a haystack until nightfall was a U Boat pen. He was seen by a local housewife, who reported the intruder to the authorities. When he returned to Colditz, Bruce received more time in solitary.

===== Triple identity ploy =====
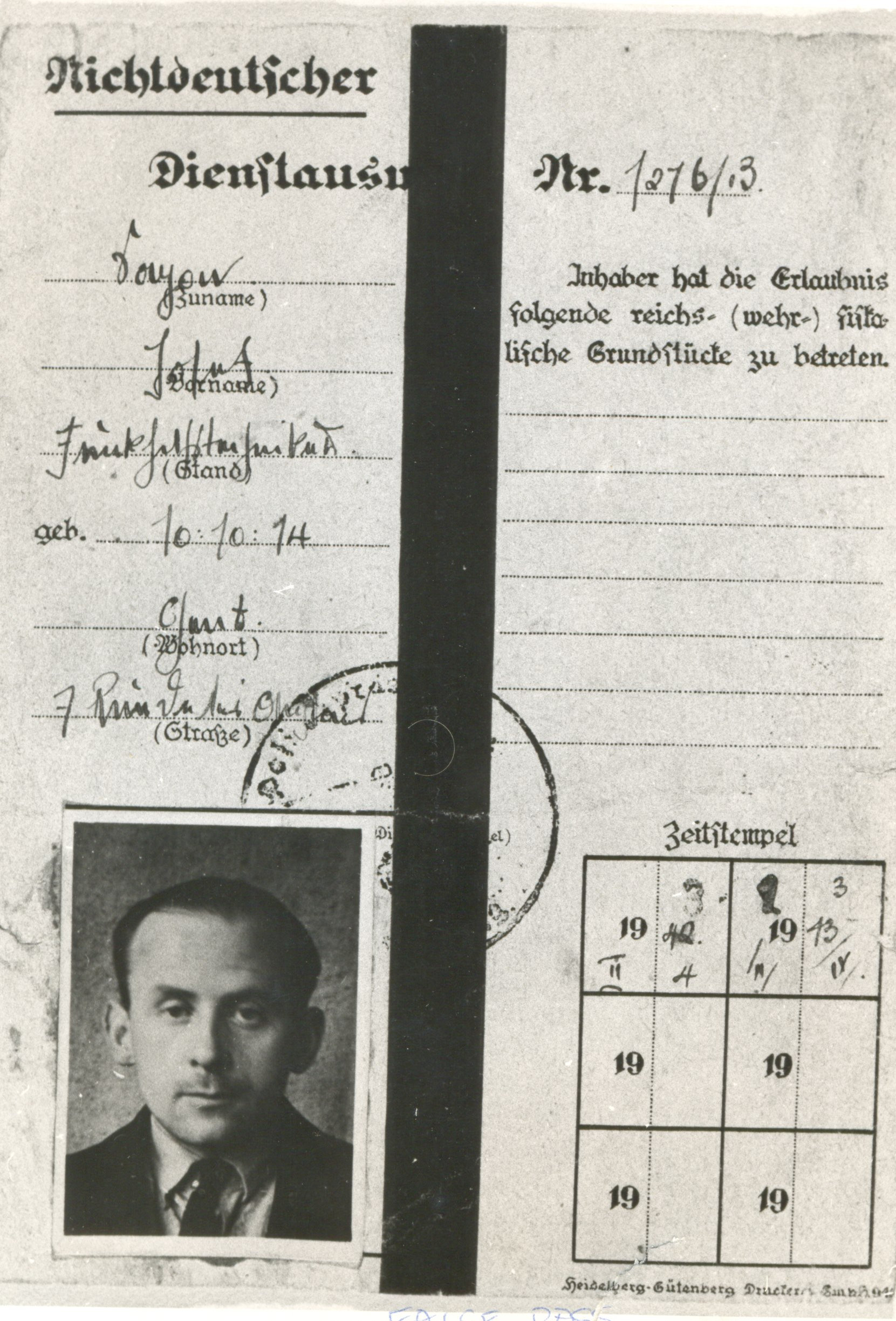
The forged papers in the name of Joe Soap used by Bruce in the Tea Chest escape

He is thought to be the inventor of the 'triple identity' ploy for use when captured (long before Frederick Forsyth described the process in 'The Day of the Jackal'), which he explains in the Imperial War Museum Sound Archive tapes. (Note: Bruce was captured in 1941. The allies did not start survival training until 1943. This highlights that Bruce was using an initiative, without any official training, with regards to the triple identity ploy. This can also give plausibility to the understanding that Bruce, if found not to be the first, was one of the first few, captured airmen, to ever use the 'triple identity ploy' technique.) The triple identity meant that he had three personae; his real identity as himself, the identity shown on his false ID papers; and another identity that he would only reveal under pressure. When he was captured, he was disguised as a Belgian Gastarbeiter or 'guest worker' named Josef Savon (his false ID is still in the possession of the Bruce family) another example of Bruce's fondness of disguises. The use of the Josef Savon disguise is also another example of Bruce's predilection for pranks, as Josef Savon translates into 'Joe Soap'. In 1944, Joe Soap was RAF slang for a legendary airman who carried the can. (Note: For the WW2 definition the etymologist Michael Quinion quoted the Royal Air Force Quarterly: "Joe Soap was the legendary airman who carried the original can. He became a synonym for anyone who had the misfortune to be assigned an unwelcome duty in the presence of his fellows, or to be temporarily misemployed in a status lower than his own. 'I'm Joe Soap,' he would say lugubriously, 'and I'm carrying the something can.' Royal Air Force Quarterly, 1944." Quinion then explains, "'Something' may be read as a polite substitute for a more forceful epithet.")

When captured, he pretended to break down and admitted he was in fact Flight Sergeant Joseph Lagan. Lagan was his brother-in-law and so Bruce could answer detailed questions about his service record etc. Initially, the delighted Germans believed him and were ready to send him to a Stalag or 'other ranks' camp. Under the Geneva Convention, other ranks (unlike officers) could be made to work; and were often taken outside camps on working parties; from which it was easy to escape. His story when captured was that he had jumped from a British plane over Bremen and arrived in Danzig on a stolen bicycle; his bicycle, unbeknown to Bruce, had a local number on it. Bruce was then sent to the RAF camp at Dulag Luft near Oberursel. Whilst at the camp, the Germans had already requested a specialist Gestapo interrogator to come from Berlin, who was to recognise Bruce. When he arrived he took one look at the supposed Flight Sergeant Lagan and said "Ah, Captain Bruce, how nice to see you again". This was the second time he had interrogated Bruce (whom the Germans habitually addressed as 'Captain'). Under heavy guard, Bruce was taken by train back to Colditz. On the overheated train, the guard detail fell asleep, and Bruce tried to escape once again but was prevented by a watchful officer.

==== Aiding an escape from solitary confinement ====
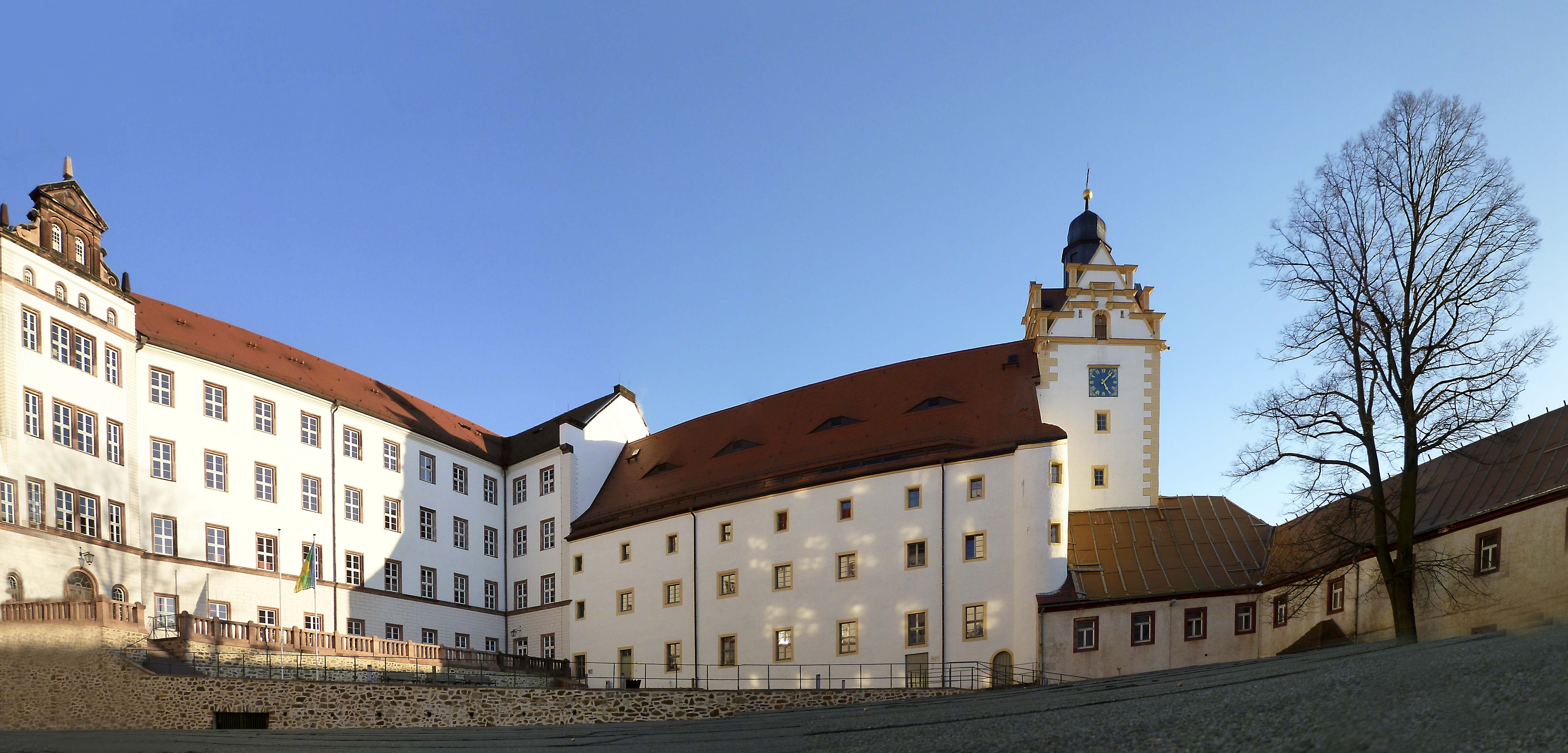
The German Kommandantur in 2011.

The 'Tea Chest Escape' made Bruce the first prisoner to escape from both Spangenberg Castle and Colditz Castle. He was soon to be joined by Howard 'Hank' Wardle MC who would soon escape from Colditz with Captain Pat Reid, Major Ronald B. Littledale, and Lieutenant Commander L. W. Stephens. Wardle had also escaped from Spangenberg Castle. (Note: Bruce and Wardle are thought to be the only two documented prisoners who have escaped from Spangenberg Castle and Colditz Castle.) This escape by Wardle, Reid, Littledale and Stephens was aided by reconnaissance from Bruce. Pat Reid explained that whilst Bruce was in solitude, he got a message smuggled to Bruce, via his food. Reid wanted Bruce to give him some detail about the German Kommandantur of the castle. In due course Reid received a return message from Bruce. This message gave him information about the specific unused staircase, the top floors, and importantly, how the door to this staircase was in full view of the Kommandantur sentries, and how this door was put into shadow by the flood lights. On 14 October 1942, in the Kommandantur cellar escape, they all used Bruce's information and tried to get the staircase door open with a dummy key. Unfortunately, the dummy key failed. This worked out though; as with their contingency plan, using the shadow, they slowly worked their way to the Kommandantur cellar to which they were to escape from.

==== Musketoon witness ====
"Who are you?" Bruce asked Black.
"Who are you?" Black parried.
"I'm an R.A.F. Officer," Bruce.
"Where from?" Black.
"I'm a Tynesider. But I havent been there for a while. Where are you from?" Bruce.
"Norway." Black.
"Well, if you want any messages sent home to England, we can send them for you," Bruce.
"Tell them things went all right in Norway." Black.

In reel 6 of the IWM tapes, Bruce relates that before Eggers -accompanied by two sinister Sicherheitsdienst (Security Service of the Reichsführer-SS) officers, hustled him back to his cell, Bruce attempted to find out more about these mysterious British strangers, but Captain Black became very evasive. "Ah" Bruce joked, "you have been told not to talk to strange men". Black laughed and the conversation ended there.

— Conversation in the civilian town cells between Bruce, who was serving time in solitude for the 'Tea Chest' escape attempt and Black, who would go on to be executed on Hitler's orders.

In October 1942, seven captured commandos were processed inside Colditz and sent to solitary confinement. These commandos had previously been involved in the Operation Musketoon raid. Inside the cells Peter Storie-Pugh, Dick Howe and Bruce had managed to have conversations with them.

On 13 October 1942, the commandos were removed from Colditz and taken to the SS-Reichssicherheitshauptamt (RHSA) headquarters in Berlin, where they were interrogated one by one by Obergruppenführer Heinrich Müller. They remained in Berlin until 22 October, when they were taken to the Sachsenhausen concentration camp. On the next day, 23 October, they were all shot in the back of the neck and their bodies cremated. These commandos were the first to fall victim to Adolf Hitler's Kommandobefehl (Commando Order) issued on 18 October 1942, which called for the execution of all commandos after capture.

In 1964, Stephen Schofield interviewed Bruce for his book 'Musketoon: commando raid, Glomfjord, 1942' (University of Michigan), revealing that while in the solitary confinement cells, Bruce managed to make contact with Captain Black DSO, leader of Operation Musketoon, the Anglo-Norwegian commando raid mounted against the German-held Glomfjord power plant in Norway. Bruce was the last British person to speak to Black before he (and six comrades) was murdered in Sachsenhausen concentration camp. The official German story given to the Red Cross was that the seven men had escaped and not been recaptured, and Colditz Oflag IVC were instructed to return any letters to their senders marked Geflohen (escaped), but Bruce's testimony was sent from Colditz to MI5 in London and ensured that the British authorities knew the truth.

Bruce was promoted again, to flight lieutenant, on 20 January 1943.

==== Escaping after August 1943 ====
By 1944, escaping was becoming tougher and riskier. Walter Morison explained that by August 1943, most of the loopholes to escape in the castle had been exploited; making escaping even harder. By spring 1944, escaping got riskier. Contrary to the Geneva convention, the use of force had been debated inside the German mess for years. Oberstleutnant Prawitt, the Kommandant, and Staff Paymaster Heinze were keen on using it on repeat offenders, such as Bruce. So was Major Amthor, the new second in command, who had joined the mess in May 1943. Amthor was a young keen Nazi and had constantly tried to argue for the use of rough measures. Amthor and Prawitt were so hated by the prisoners that whenever they entered the courtyard, they were whistled and howled at. Püpke was not a Nazi and was even given a courteous reception during Appell in the summer of 1944. In late March 1944, Hitler had disregarded the Geneva Convention with regards to POWs. The punishment for escape now carried a risk of execution. (Note: On 25 March 1944, going against objections of many senior officers, Hitler ordered the execution of 50 allied troops who had escaped from Stalag Luft III. This highlighted the fact that Hitler was no longer following the Geneva Convention with regards to POWs. This precedent meant escaping from any POW camp after 24 March 1944, carried a significant risk of execution.) Bruce made two further escape attempts in 1944: on 19 April and on 16 June.

On his 19 April escape, he cut through bars on the north side of the castle and reached the wire fence before being detected. After Bruce was seen by the sentries, he was fired at by rifles and machine guns. Knowing he did not stand a chance, Bruce surrendered. When surrendering, Bruce, to the amusement of the German guards, instead of yelling, "Ich gebe auf" ("I give up"), in a faux pas yelled, "Ich ueber gebe mich" ("I feel sick.").

==== Drain escape ====
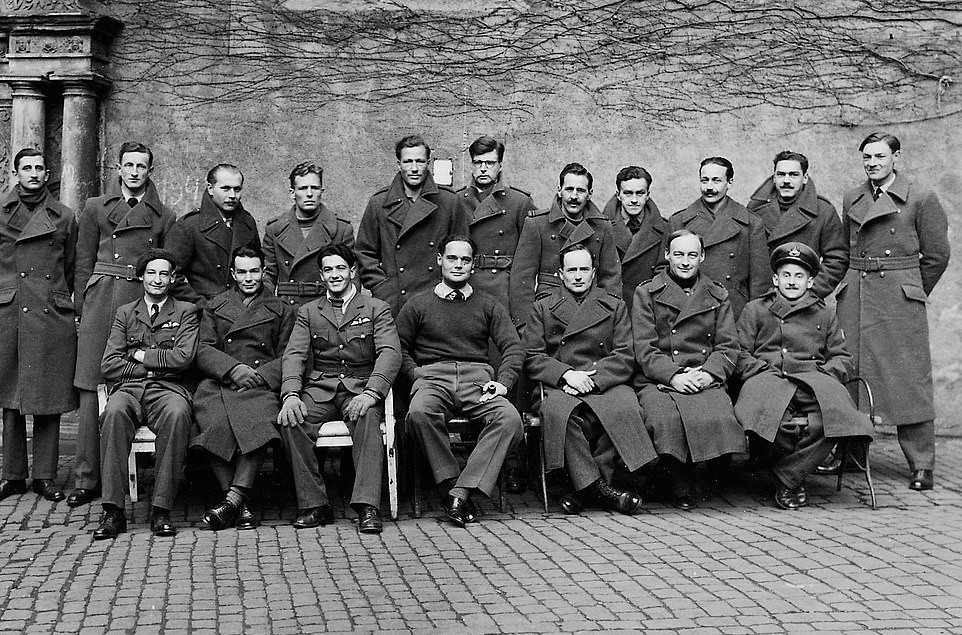
Jack Best (standing, far left), Bader (sat middle), Bruce (far right sitting)

On 16 June escape, Bruce, Major R. Lorraine and John "Bosun" Chrisp tunnelled through sewers into an old well in the German yard that had a pipe that lead into the river, but were again detected. The sewage escape route that lead to the manhole covered well, was found via the help of earlier tunnelling and reconnaissance by the Poles, along with the help of Jack Best (also of the Colditz Cock fame) and Mike Harvey. Best and Harvey had frequented with the Poles in their time as ghost prisoners and had participated in their tunnel digging. Best hated the tunnel in his days as a ghost prisoner, claiming your arse always got wet with cold waste water. Though Best noted the Poles were very proud of their dangerous tunnel. One prisoner claimed the tunnel even had a 'terrifying' electrical cable that ran inside the damp conditions. When the Poles left the castle, the tunnel was bought by a party involving Douglas Bader, for 100 cigarettes. Sometime after 1941, the Poles had dug a key hole through a rock that itself led onto the main sewer system. In 1944, Bruce, Chrisp and Lorraine, surveyed the tunnel, whilst Dick Howe ensured the kitchen, showers and toilets were off limits to other POW's. When they entered that hole they found the main sewage system led to the well; the well they were soon to be captured in. They then returned to base, to have the castle's doctor brush them with iodine, and to collect some tools which would help them hammer spikes into the well wall.

When they returned to the well, Lorraine, tied by a rope, was lowered to the bottom of the well, in what was low tide, and began hammering in the spikes. There were three manhole covers around the German Kommandantur that were within 50 yards of each other. At the archway halfway outside of the castle, a guard heard noises beneath his feet, whilst he was standing near one of the manhole covers. Upon hearing the noise, the guard gave a shout to the riot squad and security officer; and an immediate order was made to open up the three manhole covers. Staff Paymaster Heinze walked past one of the covers, spotted them and spat at them calling them "stinking swines." Later, for this abuse, the Senior British Officer (SBO), obtained an apology. A guard also threatened to shoot Bruce, Lorraine and Chrisp whilst they were in the uncovered drain. The Germans then called an immediate Sonderappell. and after this Appell, an effort was made by the escape committee to save the hundred yard tunnel from inside the ex-Polish long-room, unluckily, for the escape committee, the Appell had given the Germans enough time to uncover the rest of the shaft.

===== Facing a firing squad =====
A group for construction will be formed under orders to repair damage to an escape tunnel discovered on 16 June 1944. The group will consist of one senior officer and three junior officers. The four officers will be together in a separate barrack. The canteen will be closed temporarily during that period. Costs for the repairs will be paid by the six prisoners responsible for the tunnel: Major Lorraine, Captain Baxter, Flight Lieutenant Bruce, Lt Barnet, Lt Cocksedge, Bosun Chrisp.

Colditz, 19 June 1940.

Signed Vogt, Sonderführer [censor department].

— A translation of the notice, wrote in broken French, translated by Captain Baxter.

When Bruce, Lorraine and Chrisp were caught, according to Chrisp, Bruce became spokesman for the three in the interrogation. As spokesman he declined to answer to Eggers, on three separate times, as to where the entrance to their escape tunnel was. For this the three men where placed in front of the Saalhouse wall to stop them signalling to their comrades and faced by a firing squad; though Eggers did not give an order to fire. Shortly after this, Eggers claimed he sent a guard down the gulley to find the shaft, and found that this shaft could only have led to long room 155, whereby inside this room they caught three more comrades securing the tools and closing off the shaft; Eggers wrote he also arrested them. According to Eggers the escape drew some light on other escapes also being constructed. Chrisp explained, in his IWM tapes, the three were then put in the civilian cells outside the castle for two or three weeks. Whilst they were inside the cells, on 19 June 1944, unknowingly to the Bruce, Chrisp and Lorraine, a notice went up on the notice board. It explained to the prisoners that the Komandment wanted a group of four construction workers to fix the damage done to the drains. It also explained that Major Lorraine, Captain Baxter, Flight Lieutenant Bruce, Lt Barnet, Lt Cocksedge and Bosun Chrisp were to be billed for the damage. Chrisp explained that after their solitary confinement, the Senior British Officer informed them that the Komandment had fined them £100 each for damaging the drains. Bruce, upon hearing the fine, made a counter claim, and he billed the Kommandant for £200 each for their service of cleaning the drains that had not been cleaned for 300 years. With regards to billing the Kommandant, Chrisp explained it wasn't just Bruce behaving like this; and that in the castle, this type of behaviour went on all the time – it never stopped.

==== Last days in the castle ====
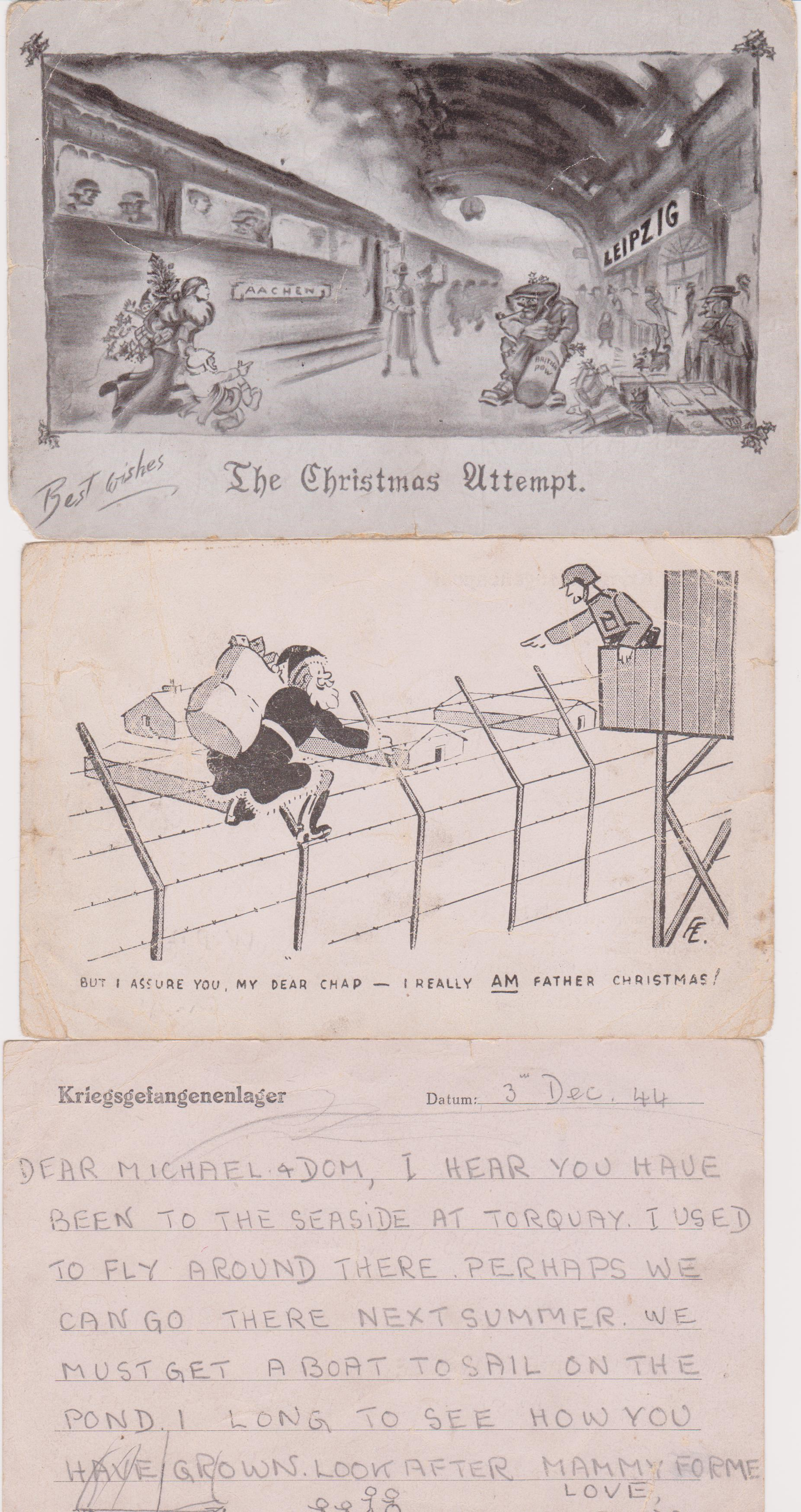
Postcards sent by Bruce to his sons, Michael and Dominic, from Colditz at Christmas 1944. He was to see them and their mother in person only four months later, after four years of absence.

The Germans were getting tired of the prisoner escapes, and in the summer of 1944, each POW camp was given a flyer reinforcing the fact the Germans were taking escaping very seriously. The notice referenced that breaking out was no longer a sport, and that prisoners would be shot if they attempted to escape. The notice was up inside the Colditz prisoner yard by 8 August 1944. Eventually, orders came (via MI9 and the Senior British Officer) that all escapes were ill-advised, and that escaping would be even more perilous in a country losing the war, and where public order and military discipline would be falling apart. Bruce and his comrades had decided to sit out the war until the liberation came in April 1945, and camp morale was hit as a result. Bruce and his comrades would also learn, to their horror, of the 50 prisoners from Stalag Luft III, getting shot for escaping. During this time Bruce and his comrades would also be updated by the events in the war by a secret radio, and as the war progressed morale would be lifted again when they found out the allies where only 150 or so miles away to the west. He and his comrades would have also found Red Cross supplies were running short and hunger would mount. On 14 April 1945, he would have heard and witnessed gun fire and he would also come to realise that Willie Tod, and the French and American senior officers negotiated the keys to the Schloss after tense negotiations. He would also have learned just how close they were, on Hitler's orders, to being marched out of the castle towards the east.

=== Liberated from Colditz ===
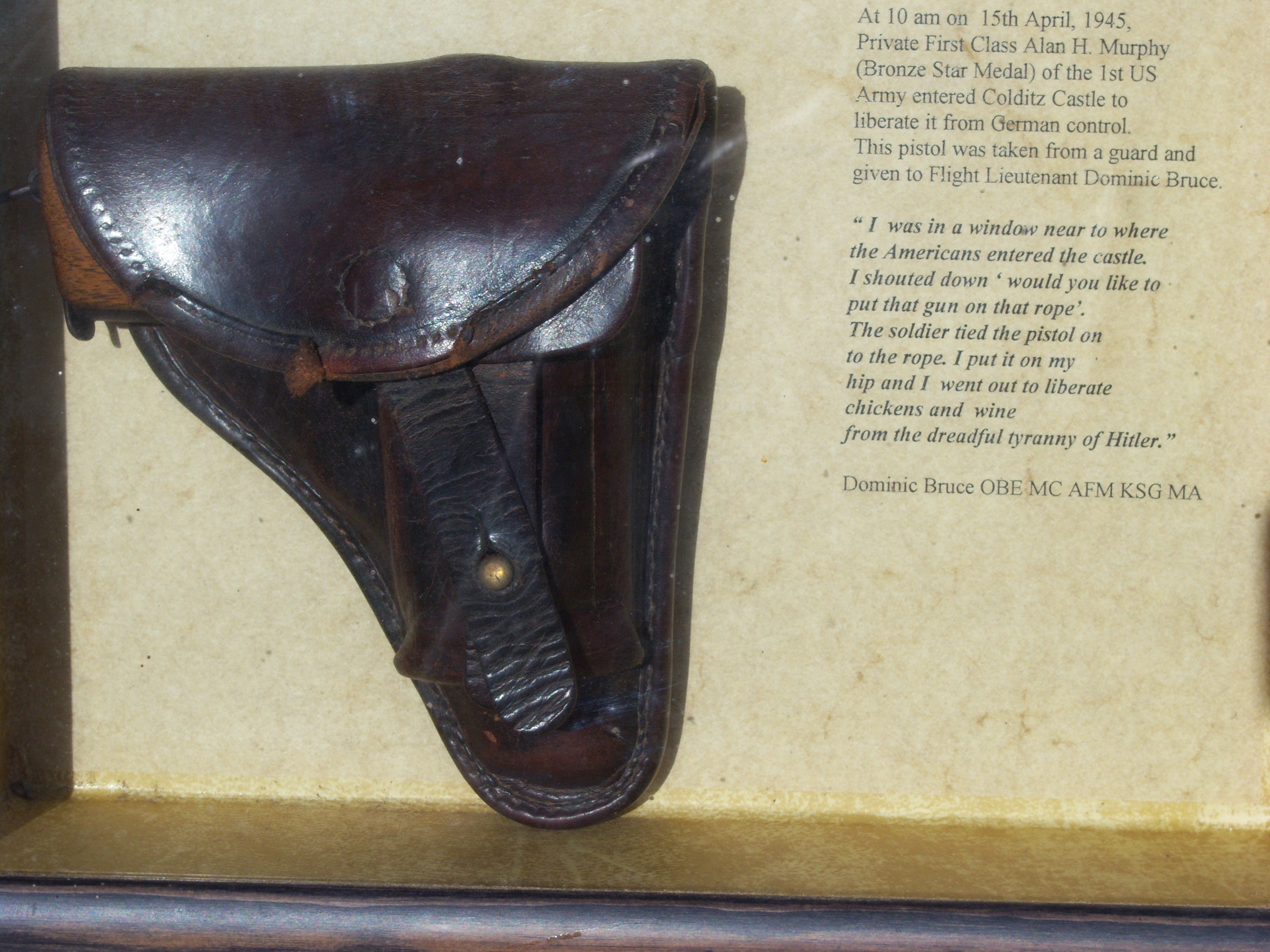
The ČZ vz. 27 semi-automatic pistol, used by Bruce in a failed attempt to liberate a chicken from Hitler's tyranny

Bruce was eventually liberated on 16 April 1945 by the US Army. In the hours prior to the liberation, Bruce witnessed the castle being shelled, and noted his comrade Bader getting knocked out of his false legs when Bader's window was hit with a shell. Prior to liberation, he also witnessed the POWs hanging French and British flags, and a flag with POW on it being hung. In a 1973 interview, Bruce described the day of liberation as pure wild west: getting guns, going off to liberate chickens and wine, and having a great time.

In the IWM tapes, Bruce describes the scene. The first GI through the castle gates heard a voice from a second-floor window. "Take that man's sidearm" the voice ordered. The GI duly disarmed a German guard, taking his ČZ vz. 27 pistol and holster. "Tie it onto this piece of string" the voice said. The GI complied. The pistol (which is still in the possession of the Bruce family) was hauled up the castle wall and disappeared into the window. Bruce (who, like the other prisoners and Germans alike, had been at near starvation levels during the last months of the war) went directly to the castle kitchens and put the gun to the head of a German cook and demanded a chicken. Sadly, there were none to be had.

Travelling home, Bruce and his comrades were loaded on to a lorry, taken to a Luftwaffe airfield and flown by a Dakota to Liege, then to Brussels and then onto Westcott in Oxfordshire, England. He and his RAF comrades travelled by train to Cosforth for debriefing and a meal of bacon and eggs, prior to travelling to Victoria railway station in London to meet the two small boys (and the wife) he had not seen since 1941.

== Military Cross ==
In October 1946, he was awarded the Military Cross (MC) for his escape attempts, making him the only person ever to be awarded both the Military Cross and the Air Force Medal. (Note: In 1993, the Air Force Medal was discontinued and replaced by the Air Force Cross. This means Bruce will be continuously unique in that he will be the only man to have received the Military Cross and the Air Force Medal combination.) The citation for his award reads:

Flight Lieutenant Bruce was shot down over Zeebrugge in June, 1941, and picked up by a German vessel. After an unsuccessful tunnel attempt in July, 1942, Flight Lieutenant Bruce and two companions made a very clever escape from Spangenburg in September, 1942, disguised as a German civilian commission and officer escort. They reached Cassel aerodrome hoping to find a Junkers 52 – the only German aircraft they knew how to fly – and, finding none of this type on the field, they decided to make for France but were caught several days later near Frankenberg. After this attempt, Flight Lieutenant Bruce was transferred to Warburg. From there he made several attempts to escape, the most successful being in January, 1942, when three men masqueraded as a German guard escorting a party of British orderlies. For this, Flight Lieutenant Bruce received three months in cells from which he attempted to escape with the aid of a dummy key, but was prevented by the bad weather. In September, 1942, he escaped from Colditz in an empty crate and made for Danzig. He was captured ten days later at Frankfurt-on-Oder, but escaped while awaiting interrogation. He reached Danzig and was arrested trying to board a troop ship. Flight Lieutenant Bruce continued to try every possible means of escape, with varying degrees of success, throughout his captivity making about seventeen attempts in all. He was liberated from Colditz in April 1945.

— London Gazette

== Second World War commentary and research ==
I was awarded the AFM in June 1939 after lightning struck the aircraft. I was knocked unconscious but when regaining consciousness mended the broken transmitter and eventually bailed out with complications. Shot down in June 1941 I spent a total of eight months in solitary for escaping activities. I escaped from Spangenberg as a German pilot intending to steal a Junkers 52. I was also court-martialled for releasing POWs in solitary so they could play cards. I escaped as a French orderly from Oflag IVB. I was then sent to Colditz in April and escaped in September of 1942. Having reached my destination of Danzig and arranged to be taken on a boat I was captured. The MC was awarded for escaping and I have been told that having an MC and AFM is rather unique.

— Written by Dominic Bruce MC AFM post war.

=== Warburg explosion ===
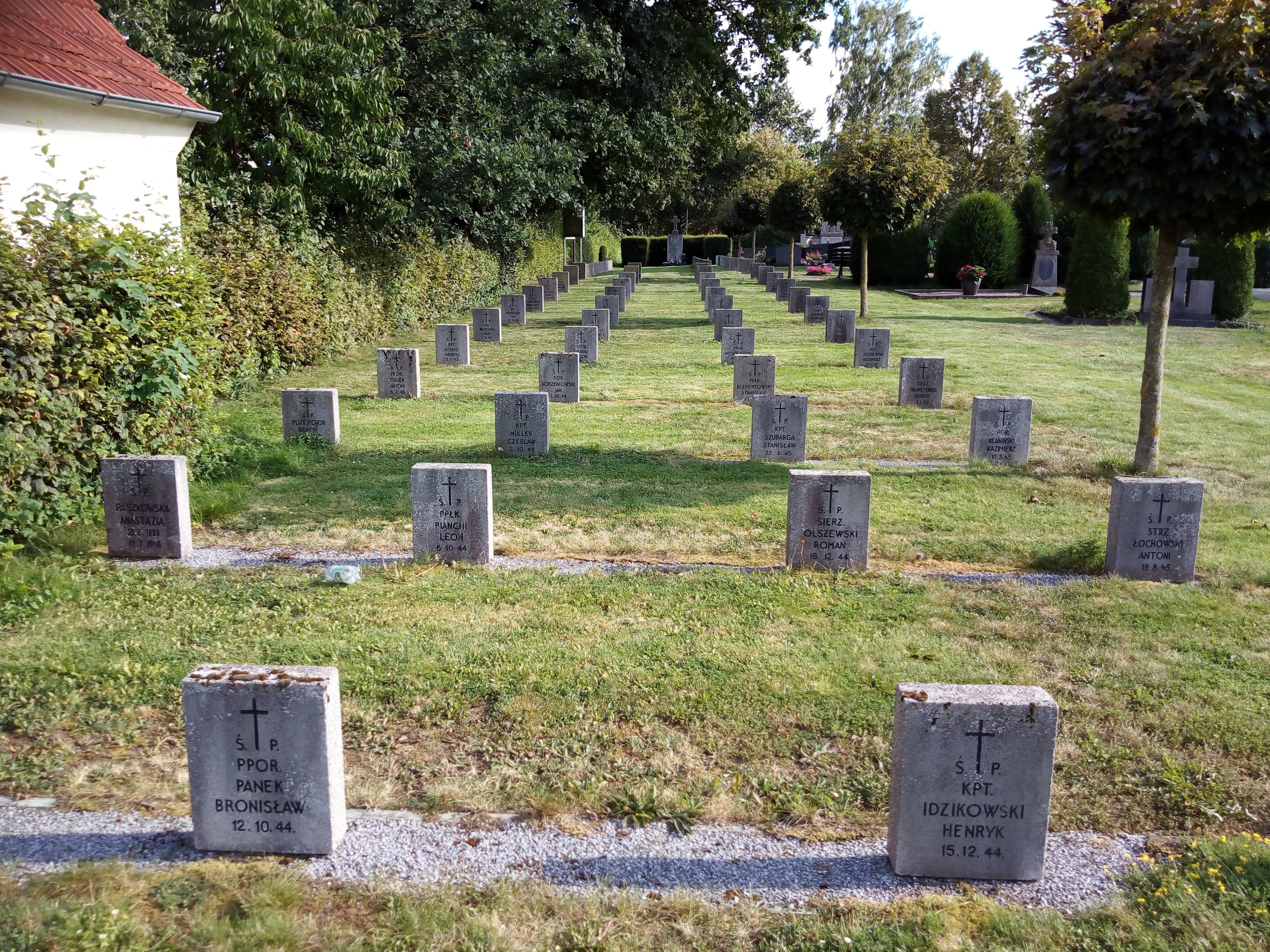
Nineteen Polish serial escapers from Colditz, rest here. All were good lads to Dominic Bruce and Pat Reid.

On 27 September 1944 an explosion happened at Oflag VI-B. The bombing killed nineteen former Colditz prisoners. A lot of these Poles, were noted escapers. Many were great mates with Dominic Bruce and Pat Reid.

One school of thought was this was an ordered attack by Adolf Hitler. Curious, Bruce and Reid investigated. Their research found that on the night No. 8 Group RAF were operating with twelve De Havilland Mosquitos of 139 (B) Squadron. Raiding Kassel, they targeted a marshalling yard and the yard was only twenty miles away from the Warburg POW camp. Weather conditions were described as poor. Reid and Bruce theorised that the RAF dropped the Dössel bomb after navigational error. Records show a mosquito missed the marshalling yard due to a navigational error. Documentation also shows, the mosquito dropped a cookie ten miles away from the yard. Bruce and Reid concluded this was the bomb dropped on the Warburg camp.

== Later life ==
=== Personal life ===
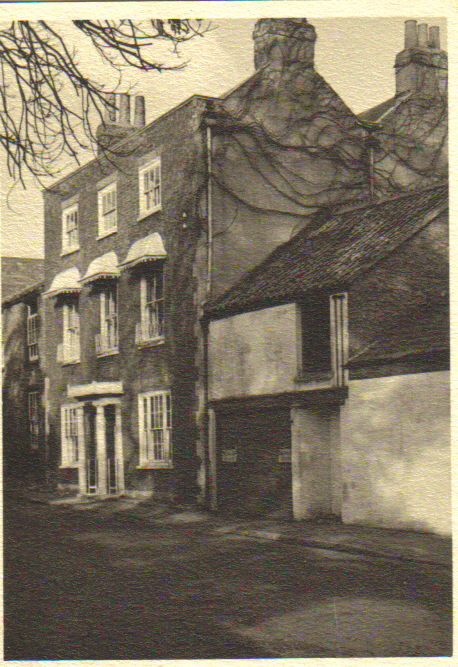
Blakesley Lodge in Lower Sunbury, the mid 18th century house where Bruce lived with his wife and nine children for most of his civilian life.

After the war, Bruce and his wife Mary, bought Blakesley Lodge in Green Street, Sunbury-on-Thames in Surrey. They brought up nine children, six boys and three girls. One of his sons, Brendan, is a communications executive, and a former director of communications to Prime Minister Thatcher. The Bruce family report that his nickname amongst the family (which was given to him by his Italian son-in-law, Piero Carloni), was 'Il Cavaliere' ('the knight') due to his papal knighthood.

=== Education ===
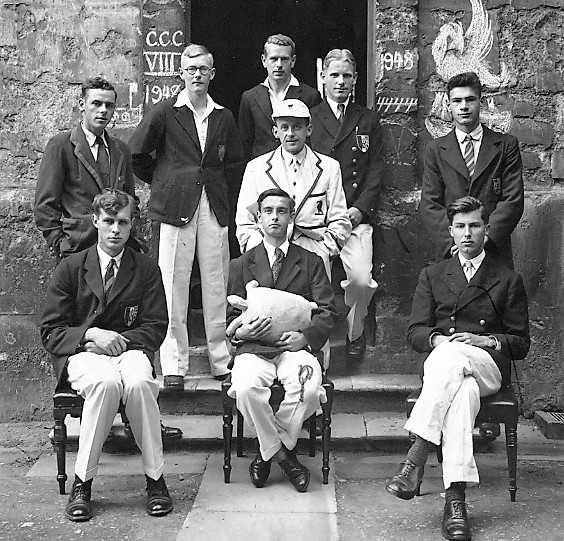
Dominic Bruce (middle in white blazer) as cox of the Corpus Christi, Oxford, rowing eight, 1948

Bruce did well at St Cuthbert's Grammar School in his youth. After finishing school, through a lack of finance, Bruce had no outlet to grasp a further education with his Higher School Certificate. This experience resonated. The literature shows he volunteered for the RAF. And after formulating his views, post war, Bruce firmly believed in adult and further education. He believed in the dignified opportunities an education can bring.

In 1946, Bruce became a student at Corpus Christi College, Oxford, reading modern history, and graduated with a Bachelor of Arts degree in 1949. He completed what was known as War Degree (7 terms) and was awarded a Master of Arts degree in 1953.

In his career in education, Bruce tended to do things his own way. He liked building academic and vocational courses. He gave opportunities to many in Surrey failed by a secondary education. He served as an adult education tutor at Bristol University, 1949–50. He was assistant secretary of the University Committee, Adult Education HM Forces, 1950–53; further education officer, Surrey County Council, 1953–59; principal, Richmond Technical Institute, 1959–62. Bruce became the founding principal of Kingston College of Further Education, 1962–1980. There was significant interest at the time for this important new position and the short list consisted of Bruce, a distinguished Royal Navy captain and an army brigadier (i.e. a 'one star' general). Bruce's quick wit was responsible for his appointment. When he entered the interview room, the chairman of the panel was reading his CV and looked up at him in astonishment, saying "it says here that you have nine children. Are they all yours?" (thinking that some were perhaps stepchildren). "So my wife assures me" came Bruce's imperturbable reply.

In 1996, a Kingston College historian Michael Gibson, described Bruce's tenure. Dominic Bruce was a principal, who "provided superb leadership and was to play a major part in developing what became a vibrant and successful institution."

==== Executive and advisory roles and honours ====
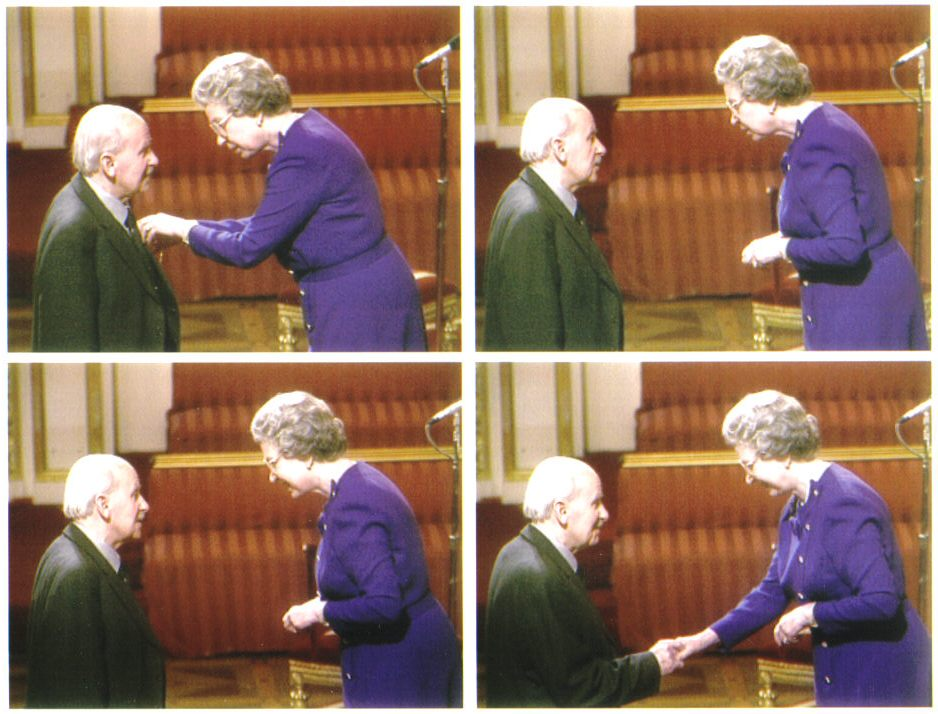
Bruce receives the OBE from HM Queen Elizabeth II

In civic and charitable bodies Bruce also acted as:

- Chairman of the Further and Higher Education Committee of the Archdiocese of Westminster
- Schools Officer, Archdiocese of Westminster, 1978–80.
- Member of the Board of Governors of St Mary's College (now St Mary's University), Twickenham
- Member of the Board of Managers of St Ignatius RC Primary School, Sunbury
- Committee member of the Association of Principals of Colleges and member of its Regional Advisory Council
- Chairman of the General Commissioners of Income Tax, Spelthorne Division
- Education Advisor to the RAF Benevolent Fund.

Bruce was made an Officer of the Order of the British Empire (OBE) by Queen Elizabeth II in 1989 for his services to Education. He was also awarded the Pontifical Equestrian Order of St. Gregory the Great (Latin: Ordo Sancti Gregorii Magni) by Pope John Paul II.

== Decorations ==

- Ribbon	Description	Notes
  	OBE	
  	Military Cross (MC)	(1939–45)
  	Air Force Medal (AFM)	1938
  	1939–45 Star	(3 September 1939 – 2 September 1945)
  	Air Crew Europe Star	(3 September 1939 – 5 June 1944)
  	War Medal 1939–1945	(3 September 1939 – 2 September 1945)
  	Order of St. Gregory the Great	
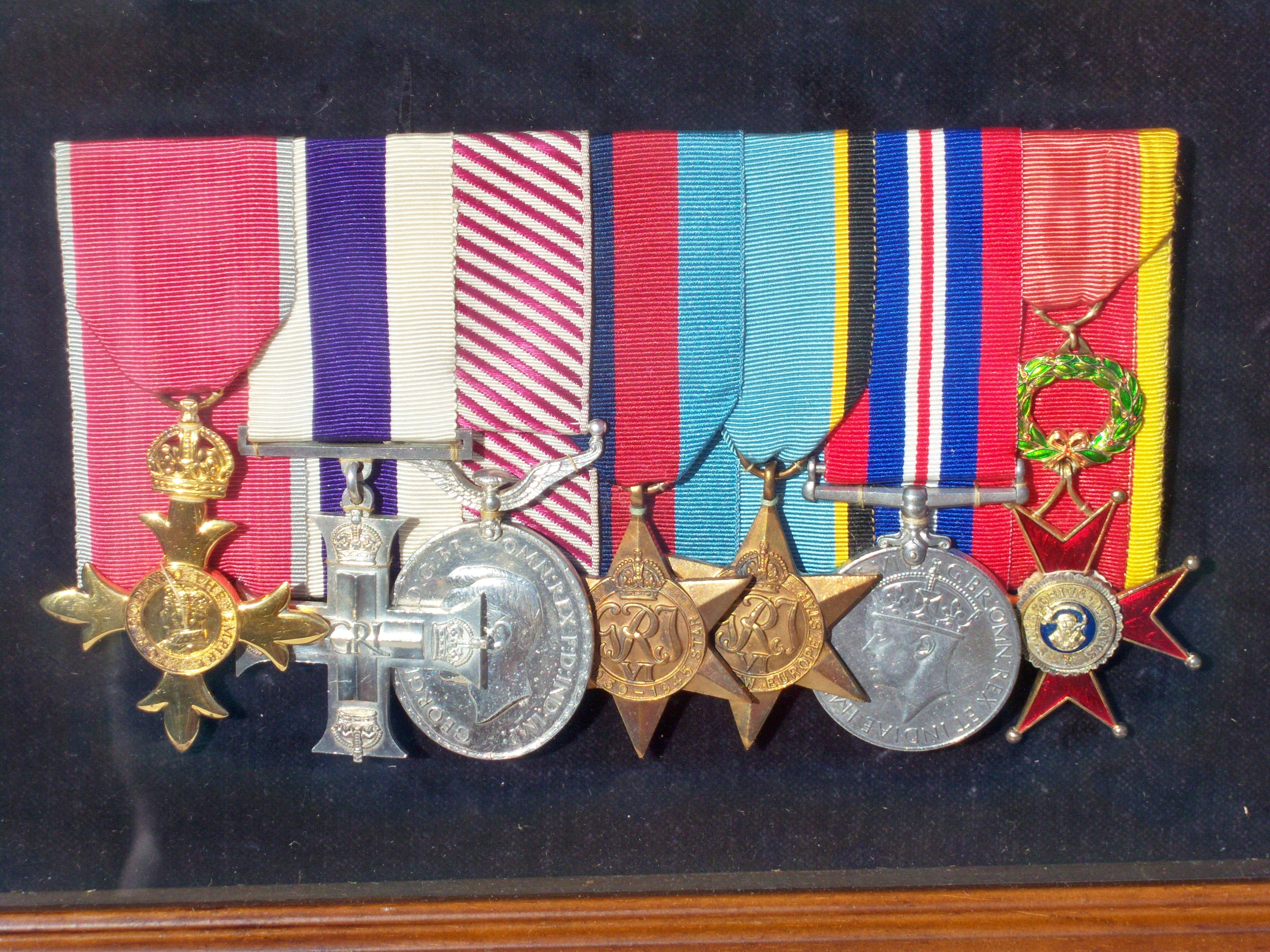
- Dominic Bruce's unique medal group, now owned by the Lord Ashcroft collection

== Death and legacy ==
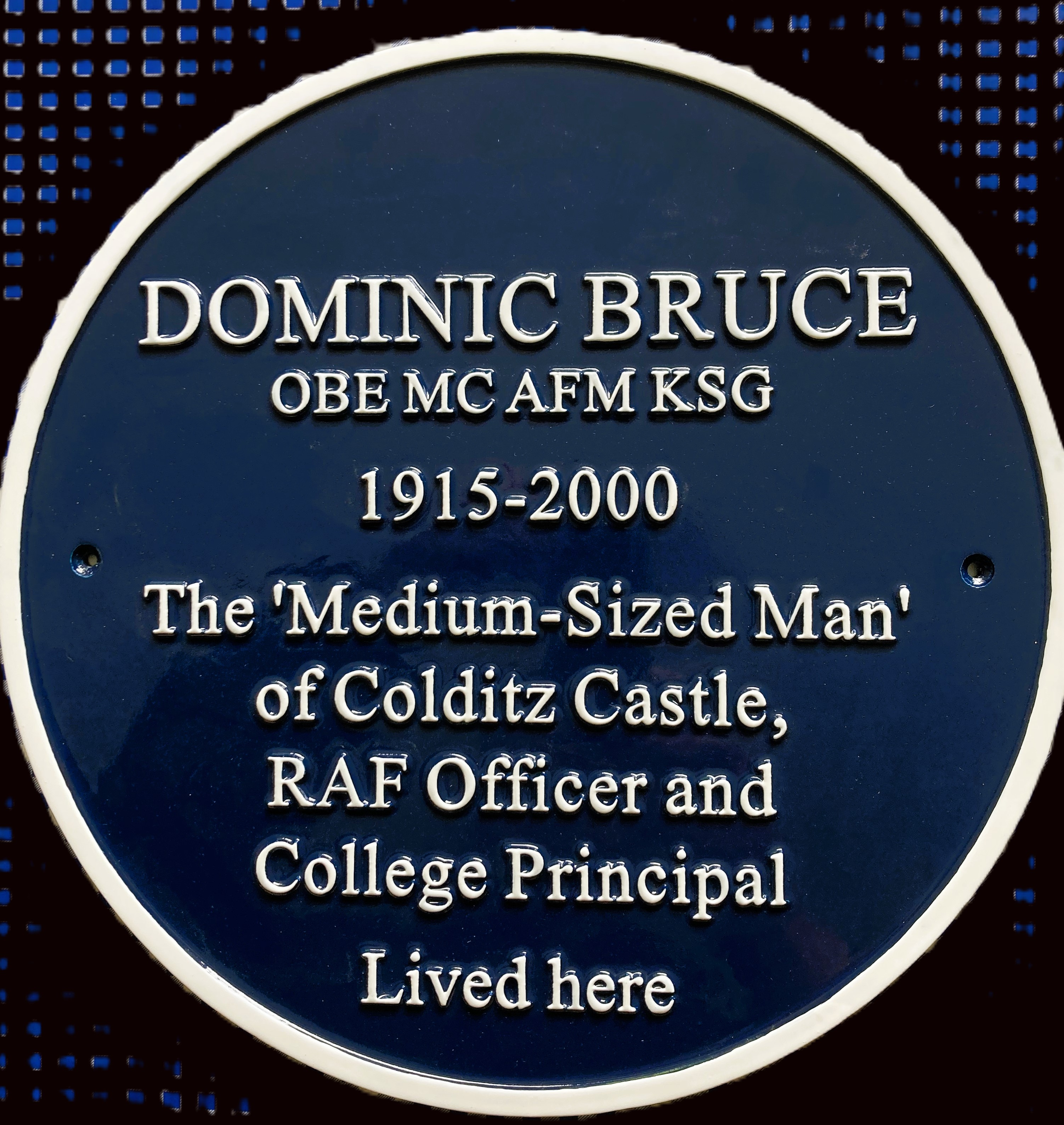
Dominic Bruce. Hebburn. Blue plaque.

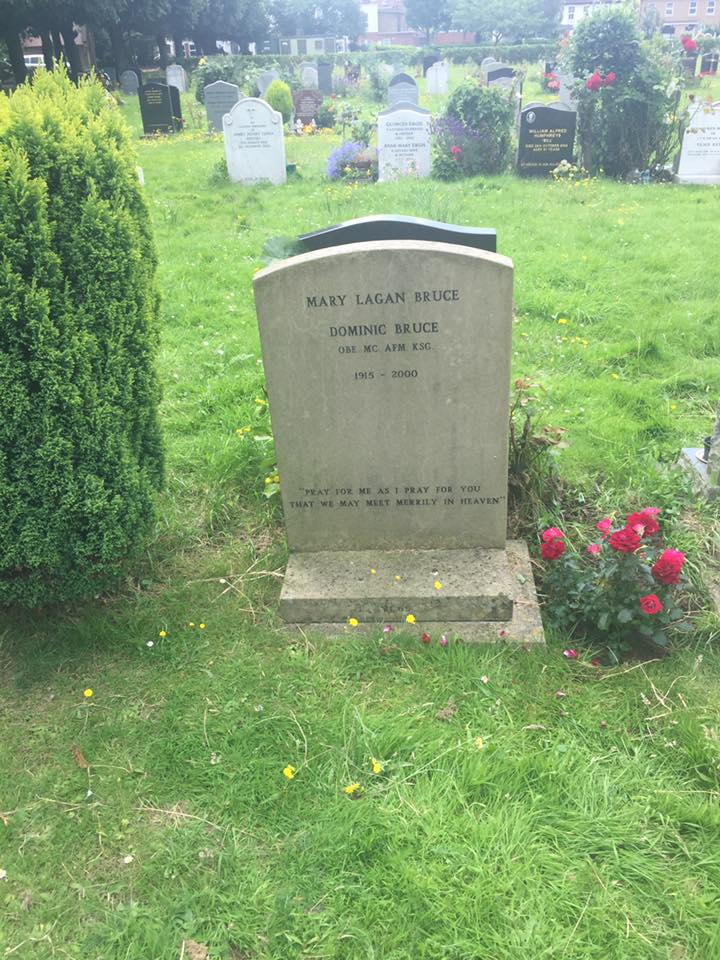
The grave of Dominic Bruce OBE MC AFM KSG MA RAF and his wife of 62 years Mary Lagan Bruce

Dominic Bruce died on 12 February 2000 in Richmond, Surrey, England. He was survived by Mary Brigid Bruce (died 15 June 2000) and his six sons and three daughters.

He is buried (along with his wife Mary Lagan Bruce, and his sixth child, Timothy Patrick Bruce, 1950-2008) in Teddington Cemetery.

In 2015, his medal group (unique in that he is the only person in British military history to be awarded both the Military Cross and the Air Force Medal) was donated by his family to the Ashcroft Trust for the benefit of the RAF Benevolent Fund and the British Red Cross, the latter having kept him alive in Colditz by the sending of regular food parcels. Bruce Drive in Hebburn is named after him.

On 7 June 2024 (his 109th birthday), 79 years after the end of the Second World War in Europe, with a blue plaque, Hebburn and Tyneside paid homage to the war hero, Dominic Bruce. The ceremony was attended by a representative of IX Squadron (now based in Lossiemouth), and the President of Corpus Christi College, Oxford University, who published an article by his son Brendan Bruce in the college's alumni magazine 'The Pelican Record' https://www.thedominiclagangallery.com/blogs/the-medium-sized-man

== Filmography, sound and literature ==
Bruce and many of his comrades in Colditz have featured prominently in books, TV, film and documentaries. Bruce has advised on historical books on the subject of Colditz. Bruce was one of the numerous veterans of Colditz who advised on Michael Booker's book Collecting Colditz and Its Secrets. His expertise on Colditz was also used by Pat Reid, who included Bruce in his monthly committee of six, who advised Reid on his book Colditz: The Full Story. Bruce is also the subject of a work of fiction, the children's adventure story "Martha & the Medium Sized Man.

In his autobiographical book, The Tunnellers of Sandborstal (Robert Hale, 1959), Lieutenant Commander John 'Bosun' Chrisp MBE RN said that "Bruce's adventures in various corners of occupied Europe read like John Buchan (author of The Thirty Nine Steps) at his most melodramatic" and that Bruce "can claim to be the most ingenious and unlucky escaper of the war." Eric Foster's autobiography, Life Hangs by a Silken Thread is an eyewitness source for the Swiss Red Cross Commission escape at Spangenberg Castle.

=== Portrayals in film and television ===
In the BBC TV series Colditz (1972–74), which chronicled the lives of the Allied prisoners of war held in the castle, one of the characters portrayed was Flight Lieutenant Simon Carter (played by David McCallum), a young, upstart, hot-headed RAF officer who enjoys goon-baiting and is very impatient to escape. The fictional Carter closely resembles Bruce. In the episode, from series one, 'Gone Away, part 1', first shown 18 January 1973, the 'Tea Chest Escape' was re-enacted.

Colditz, a 2005 British two-part television miniseries produced by Granada Television for ITV, written by Peter Morgan and directed by Stuart Orme, features a fictionalised account of an actual event when three inmates; Dick Lorraine, John 'Bosun' Chrisp, and the 'Medium Sized Man', Dominic Bruce attempted to escape using the castle sewers. In reality the escape team were discovered when they attempted to exit a manhole. The Germans threatened to throw grenades down into the sewer chamber and, as the escapers could not reverse back up the sewer pipe, they were forced to surrender. They were immediately put in front of a firing squad, but unlike the fictional TV account, the guards did not fire. As he explained in the IWM tapes, just before the order was to be given, Bruce lost his temper and approached the officer in charge, Eggers, saying "you can shoot us, but after the War we'll hang you". Eggers stood the squad down.

The 'Red Cross Commission' escape from Spangenberg provided the plot for the 1961 film, Very Important Person although no acknowledgement was made by the producers at the time. In the film, James Robertson Justice also escapes disguised as a Swiss civilian Commissioner, just as Bruce had done in real life. (Note: In WWII there were at least two documented 'Swiss Commission' escapes. The original Swiss Commission involved Bruce, Newborn and Tunstall. This escape occurred in Spangenberg in September 1941. This escape is cited by the historian Rollings and Foster. There was also the escape in Warburg in 1942, which occurred months after Bruce and Tunstall were moved to Colditz. The Warburg escape is also cited by the historian Rollings. The plot to the film 'Very Important Person' clearly has similarities, or outlines, to the Swiss Commission escapes attempted in WWII. With regards to the Spangenberg attempt: In the film, there was a tunnel escape attempt which failed. This attempt was prior to the trio escaping with a Swiss Commission. This plot outline has similarities to the Spangenberg escape. Prior to the Spangenberg Swiss Commission escape there was also a failed tunnel which Bruce, Newborn and Tunstall left to others. Currently no evidence exists of the writers of the Very Important Person film ever explaining they were influenced by any Swiss Commission escape in WWII. Nonetheless, it can be reasonably deduced that the film plot was influenced by the Swiss Commission escapes in WWII.)

On the 70th Anniversary of the liberation of Colditz, the BBC programme 'The One Show' featured photographs of the 'Tea Chest' escape which were discussed by the participants.

=== Documentaries ===
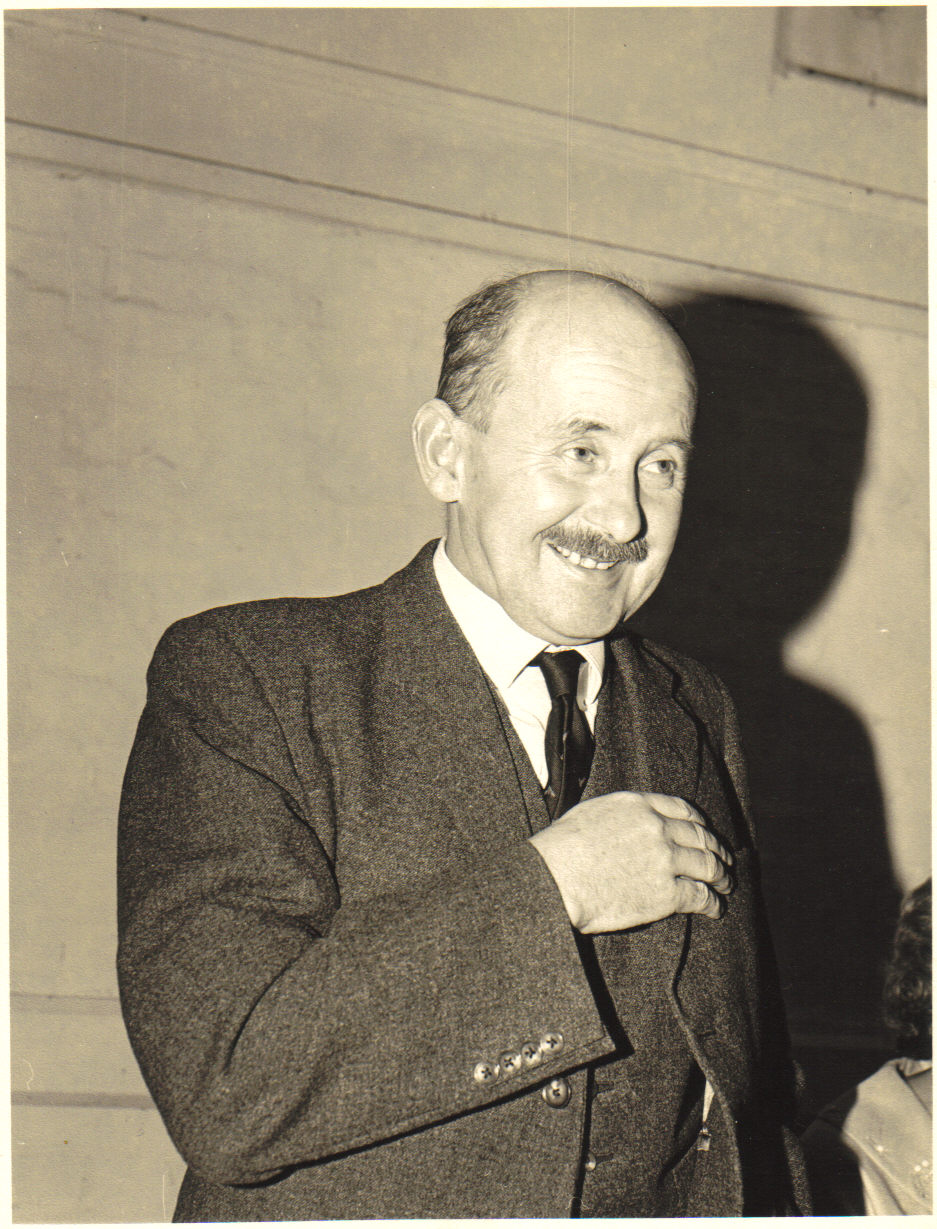
Bruce in later life, carrying out one of his many public speaking engagements

The BBC series Colditz (1972–74), was such a success that it was quickly repeated. In order to make up the episodes to a sixty-minute slot (the BBC had hoped to sell the series to the US, hence the use of Robert Wagner, so they had to be only fifty minutes in length to include commercials) a select group of six Colditz escapers were interviewed individually by the famous war correspondent Frank Gillard and shown immediately after the repeat programmes were broadcast. Bruce was one of the interviewees. The documentary series was called Six from Colditz, and Bruce's interview was listed on 17 April 1973, and also on 17 January 1974 in the Radio Times. (Note: Pre 1980 the BBC had a practice of wiping. This interview may be lost.) Transcripts of Bruce's interview, with Gillard, which aired in 1973, exist.

Other appearances on film include:

- 2001 World War II: Prisoners of War
- 2001 Bomber Command (TV mini-series) – himself
- 1993 "The Story of Colditz" (documentary)
- 1992 On a Wing and a Prayer (documentary) – himself (as Flt. Lt. Dominic Bruce MC AFM KSG)
- 1964 Meeting Point: Whisper Who dares! (TV Series documentary) – himself (interviewee)

From 1996 to 2006, the Colditz Society created a selection of filmed interviews with many Colditz survivors. Bruce was recorded and is referenced in the collection. These interviews are now museum artefacts and are held in the Imperial War Museum.

== Sources ==
Books

- Booker, Michael (30 April 2005). Collecting Colditz and Its Secrets (Kindle ed.). Grub Street Publishing. ISBN 978-1904943082.
- Bradshaw, P.; Benjamin, B.; Cotterell, A. (1999). Kingston College: A Brief History. Kingston, Surrey: CDT Printers.
- Chrisp MBE RN, John 'Bosun' (1959). The Tunnellers of Sandborstal. United Kingdom: Robert Hale.
- Chancellor, Henry (2001). Colditz: The Definitive History. London, UK: Hodder & Stoughton. ISBN 978-0-34079-494-4.
- Clay, Peter (2014). Voices of Colditz: Handwritten Accounts by Allied Officers Inside Oflag IV-C. United Kingdom: Fonthill Media. ISBN 9781781553862.
- Eggers, R. (1961). Colditz. The German Story. Translated by Gee, H. United Kingdom: Robert Hale.
- Felton, Mark (2 October 2014). Zero Night. Icon Books Ltd. ISBN 978-1-84831-792-5.
- Foster, Eric (1 February 1992). Life Hangs by a Silken Thread: An Autobiography by Squadron Leader. England: Astia Publishing. ISBN 978-0951898307.
- Green, Julius Morris (25 November 1971). From Colditz in Code. United Kingdom: Robert Hale. ISBN 978-0709124825.
- Hunt, Philip A. (1988). Biographical Register 1880-1974 Corpus Christi College (University of Oxford). Oxford, England: The College. ISBN 9780951284407.
- Kerr, Gordon (2011). Fugitives: Dramatic Accounts of Life on the Run. England: Canary Press eBooks. ISBN 9781907795763.
- Lagan, Dominic (12 November 2010). Martha and The Medium Sized Man. Great Ormond Street Hospital for Children.
- Mackenzie, S. P. (2006). The Colditz Myth: British and Commonwealth Prisoners of War in Nazi Germany (illustrated, reprint ed.). United Kingdom: Oxford University Press. ISBN 9780199203079.
- Ray, David (2004). Colditz: A Pictorial History. London, UK: Caxton Editions. ISBN 1-84067-156-4.
- Reid, P. R. (1954). The Colditz Story. London, UK: Pan Books.
- Reid, P. R. (1984). Colditz: The Full Story. New York: St. Martin's. ISBN 0-312-00578-4.
- Reid, P. R. (2003). The Latter Days at Colditz. London, UK: Cassell Military Paperbacks. ISBN 0-304-36432-0.
- Reid, P. R. (2015). Colditz: The Full Story. New York: Voyageur Press. ISBN 9780760346518.
- Rogers, Jim (1986). Tunnelling into Colditz: a mining engineer in captivity. United Kingdom: R. Hale. ISBN 9780709028048.
- Rollings, Charles (26 November 2003). Wire and Walls: RAF Prisoners of War in Itzehoe, Spangenberg and Thorn 1939-42. United Kingdom: Ian Allan Publishing. ISBN 978-0711029910.
- Rollings, Charles (1 September 2004). Wire and Worse: RAF Prisoners of War in Laufen, Bibarach, Lubeck and Warburg 1940-42. Vol. 2. United Kingdom: Ian Allan Publishing. ISBN 978-0711030503.
- Schädlich, Thomas (2016). Tales from Colditz Castle: Diary from Martin Schädlich. Colditz, Germany: Verlag Schädlich. Kindle Edition. ASIN B01M0YQGZM.
- Schofield, Stephen (1964). Musketoon: commando raid, Glomfjord, 1942 (First ed.). Michigan: Cape (University of Michigan).
- Thorburn, Gordon (2006). Bombers, First and Last. United Kingdom: Robson. ISBN 9781861059468.
- Tunstall, Peter (2014). The Last Escaper. London, UK: Duckworth. ISBN 978-0-71564-923-7.
- Wilson, Patrick (11 September 2000). The War Behind the Wire. United Kingdom: Pen and Sword. ISBN 9780850527452.
- Wood; Watton (1946). Detour: The Story of Oflag IV C. United Kingdom: Red Cross & Falcon Press.

Letters

- Bruce, Dominic (5 September 1979). "Colditz...". Letter to Peter Tunstall.

Museum artefacts

- Bruce, Brendan (1999). "Bruce, Dominic (Oral history); (Catalogue number 22332)". iwm.org.uk. Imperial War Museum.
- Bruce, Brendan (2000). "Mary Bruce interviewed". cadensa.bl.uk. Oral History Sound Archive of the British Library.
- Bruce, Dominic (17 May 2002). "Private Papers of Flight Lieutenant D Bruce MC AFM (Documents.12124)"". iwm.org.uk. Imperial War Museum.
- Colditz Society (2006). "Collection of Interviews With Colditz Survivors (Film number:6636)". iwm.org.uk. Colditz Society (Production sponsor).
- IWM (12 May 1941). "ALLIED PRISONERS OF WAR AT OFLAG IVC, COLDITZ". iwm.org.uk. Imperial War Museum.
- IWM Great Escapes Exhibition (2004). "Great Escapes (exhibition); (Catalogue number Art.IWM PST 20321)". iwm.org.uk. Imperial War Museum.
- RAF Marham Museum (2018), Dominic Bruce Silk Map, Norfolk and Suffolk: Norfolk and Suffolk Aviation Museum (RAF Marham Museum)
- Tunstall, Peter (15 February 1942). "Bader & Tunstall split photo letter". rafmuseum.org.uk. RAF Museum.
- Windle, Dave (1 June 2006). "Bruce, Dominic (Oral history); (Catalogue number 29172)". iwm.org.uk. Imperial War Museum; Colditz Society.
- Wood, Conrad (13 September 1996). "Chrisp, John 'Bosun'(Oral history)(Catalogue number 16843)"". iwm.org.uk. Imperial War Museum.

Magazines, Newspapers & journals

- Air Ministry (8 June 1939). "Supplement: 34633". The London Gazette (Supplement). London.
- Air Ministry (7 March 1941). "Supplement: 35097". The London Gazette (Supplement). London.
- Air Ministry (21 April 1942). "Supplement: 35531". The London Gazette (Supplement). London.
- Air Ministry (13 April 1943). "Supplement: 35981". The London Gazette (Supplement). London.
- Air Ministry (8 October 1946). "Supplement: 37750". The London Gazette (Supplement). London.
- Battle, Ken (2 July 2018). "Flt. Lt. Dominic Bruce, AFM, MC, OBE". Sunbury Matters & Sunbury; Shepperton Local History Society. Sunbury: villagematters.co.uk.
- Chronicle Crown Court Staff (8 August 2018). "Newcastle Crown Court". Chronicle. Newcastle: chroniclelive.co.uk.
- Gibson, Michael R. (23 September 1996). "Landmarks in the development of kingston university" (PDF). Kingston University' Press. United Kingdom: cdn.kingston.ac.uk.
- Henderson, Tony (13 June 2024). "A PoW escape specialist whose remarkable story was featured in The QT has been commemorated in the town where he grew up". The QT. Newcastle: theqt.online.
- Honan, William H. (4 March 2000). "Dominic Bruce, 84, Briton Who Tried to Escape Nazis 17 Times". The New York Times.
- Keleny, Anne (16 July 2013). "Lord Campbell of Alloway: Lawyer whose skills saved lives in Colditz". The Independent. United Kingdom.
- Lake, Evie (13 June 2024). "Tyneside war hero honoured with blue plaque in Hebburn". Gazette. shieldsgazette.com.
- Lejenäs, Harald (1 March 1989). "The Severe Winter in Europe 1941–42: The Large-scale Circulation, Cut-off Lows, and Blocking". Bulletin of the American Meteorological Society. 70 (3). Stockholm, Sweden: University of Stockholm, Arrhenius Laboratory, S-106 91: 271. Bibcode:1989BAMS...70..271L. doi:10.1175/1520-0477(1989)070<0271:TSWIET>2.0.CO;2.
- Moss, Peter W. (August 1975). "Aeroplane Biography No.4 – Handley Page Harrow K6940". Air Pictorial. Vol. 37, no. 8.
- Radio Times (21 January 1974). "Listings". Radio Times. Vol. 202, no. 2619. United Kingdom: BBC (published 17 January 1974). pp. 12–13. Archived from the original on 17 October 2014.
- Schofield, Stephen (6 February 1965), "Orders From Hitler – And Death For Seven", Vancouver Sun, Vancouver
- The Timaru Herald Staff (6 July 2013). "Colditz prisoner became a top lawyer". The Timaru Herald. New Zealand – via PressReader.
- Whitehouse, Jock (23 February 2016). "From The Archives" (PDF). 214 Squadron - NightJar. United Kingdom: 214squadron.org.uk.
- Younger, Owen (13 June 2024). "Tyneside RAF officer whose Second World War escape attempts inspired a BBC TV show honoured". chronicle. Newcastle: chroniclelive.co.uk.

Websites

- Alexander, Dr Kirsten (1 November 2018). "Thomas Albert Bax". australiansinsliii.blogspot.com. Australians in Stalag Luft III.
- AR (2 December 2018). "Search: Schneider, Walter". aircrewremembered.com. KrackerDatabase.
- AR (3 March 2021). "09.06.1941 9 Squadron Wellington IC R1758…". aircrewremembered.com.
- BAAA (25 March 1937). "Crash of a Handley Page H.P.54 Harrow I in Napsbury". Bureau of Aircraft Accidents Archives. Archived from the original on 14 August 2018.
- BAAA (6 October 1938). "Crash of a Handley Page H.P.54 Harrow II in Kirk Smeaton". Bureau of Aircraft Accidents Archives.
- Baker & Jones (16 April 2015). "The One Show". bbc.co.uk. bbc.
- Council Staff (27 February 2024). "New Blue Plaques to Recognise Notable Figures". gov.uk. southtyneside.gov.uk.
- Council Staff (b) (15 June 2024). "Dominic Bruce - Blue Plaques".
- Council Staff (c) (12 June 2024). "Hebburn-born WWII Navigator Honoured with Blue Plaque". southtyneside.gov.uk. gov.uk.
- CWGC (9 June 1941). "Casualty Details: Arnold, Roy George Claringbould; Service Number 29198". www.cwgc.org. Commonwealth War Graves Commission.
- de Meester, Wim (15 November 2018). "Crash No 107" (PDF). db.wingstovictory.nl. Airwar Museum Netherlands. Archived from the original (PDF) on 15 November 2018.
- GM-L (2018). "Decorations & Medals". gm-league.com. The Gallantry Medalists' League.
- Irvin (2018). "Caterpillar Club". irvingq.com. irvingq.
- Klein, Christopher (25 March 2014). "Remembering "The Great Escape," 70 Years Ago". history.com.
- Mason, Amanda (6 February 2018). "Who's Who in an RAF Bomber Crew". iwm.org.uk. Imperial War Museum.
- Morison, Walter (23 July 2003). "Colditz 1945: The Last Days". bbc.co.uk. BBC.
- Quinion, Michael (18 August 2007). "Joe Soap". worldwidewords.org.
- RAF St Mawgan (2015). "RAF Survival Training". RAF St Mawgan. Archived from the original on 6 August 2015.
- Tickell, Pamela (28 February 2024). "Blue plaques for war hero, archaeologist and mayor". bbc.co.uk. BBC.
- TOW (2018). "Bruce, Dominic". www.tracesofwar.com. Traces of War.
- Tyson, Peter (2001). "Escaping Colditz". pbs.org. NOVA Online.
- Veterans SA (10 June 2016). "The legacy of Bomber Command". anzaccentenary.sa.gov.au. gov.au. Archived from the original on 19 September 2018.

Videos

- Beardsall, Lyn (2001). World War II: Prisoners of War. United Kingdom: Classic Pictures.
- Colditz Society (2021). "Collection of Interviews With Colditz Survivors". youtube.com. Colditz Society (Production sponsor).
- Colditz Society (Bruce talk) (2021). "C S VideoArchives No 1 Dominic Bruce". youtube.com. Colditz Society (Production sponsor).
- Garofalo, Robert (1992). On a Wing and a Prayer. United Kingdom: Classic pictures.
- Garofalo, Robert (1993). The Story of Colditz (Documentary). United Kingdom: Classic Pictures & Castle Communications.
- Garofalo, Robert (2001). Bomber Command. United Kingdom: Classic media.
- Sproxton, Vernon (26 April 1964). Meeting Point – Whisper Who Dares.
