= Oflag IX-A/H =

World War II German prisoner-of-war camp

Oflag IX-A
- Spangenberg, Hesse
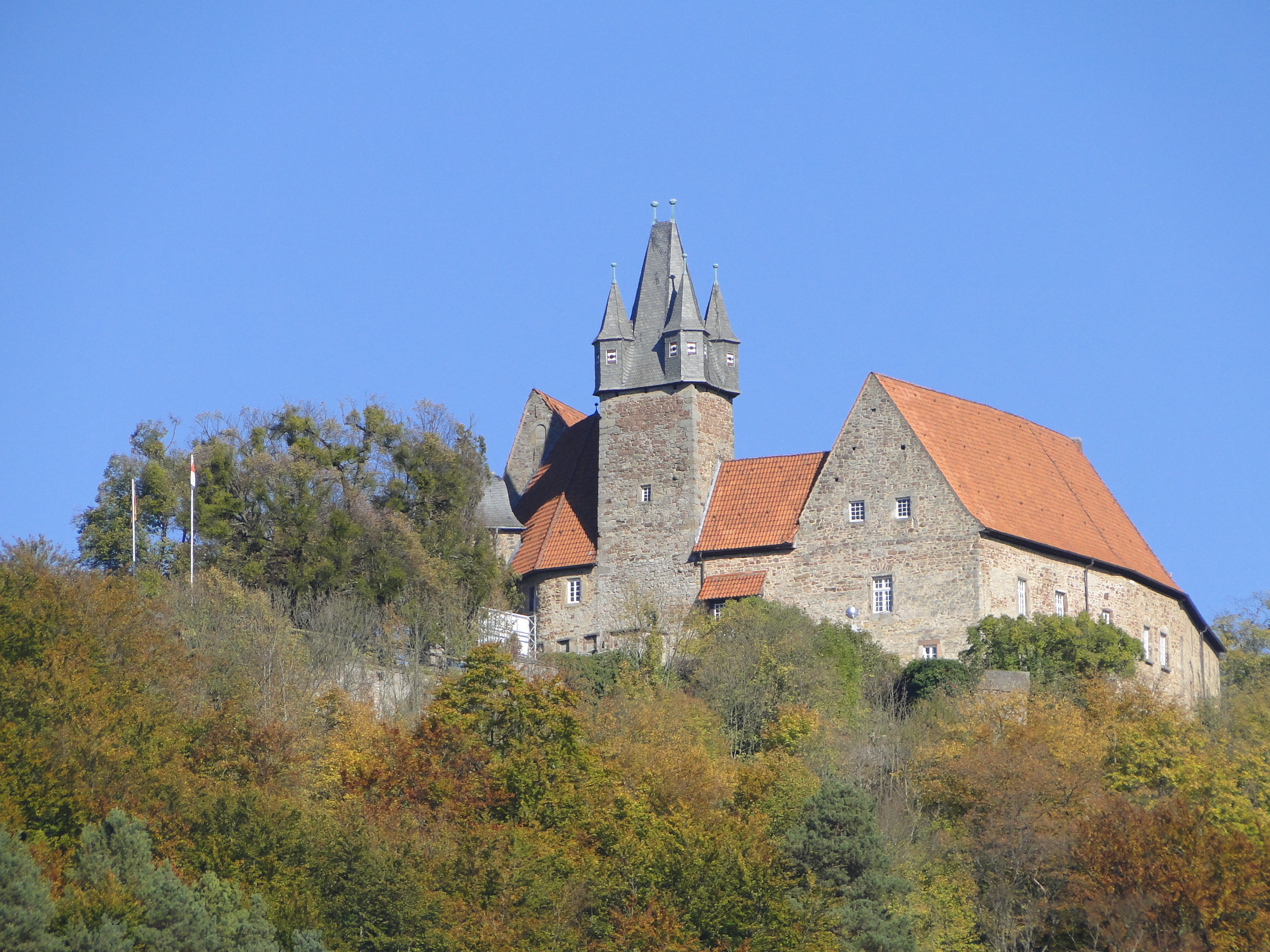
- Schloss Spangenberg

Site information
- Type: Prisoner-of-war camp
- Controlled by: Nazi Germany

Location
- Spangenberg, Germany, (pre-war borders, 1937)
- Location within Germany
- Coordinates: 51°7′9.86″N 9°39′43.51″E

Site history
- In use: 1939–1945

Garrison information
- Occupants: French and British officers

Oflag IX-A was a World War II German prisoner-of-war camp located in Spangenberg Castle in the small town of Spangenberg in northeastern Hesse, Germany.

== Camp history ==
The camp was opened in October 1939 as Oflag IX-A to house POWs from the British Royal Air Force and the French Armée de l'Air. The camp was renamed Oflag IX-A/H (Hauptlager, "Main camp") in June 1940, after Oflag IX-C at Rotenburg an der Fulda became a sub-camp (Zweiglager) designated Oflag IX-A/Z.

The first person to escape from the camp was Flight Lieutenant Howard Wardle in August 1940, but he was recaptured and sent to Oflag IV-C at Colditz Castle.

On the 21 October 1940 the POW Eric Foster was one of twenty-six selected to move to Spangenberg from Dulag Luft. In his autobiography Foster stated "Dulag Luft had been described as the best camp in Germany... Spangenberg was described as the end of hope." Foster explained though the Schloss, upon arrival, looked like a fairy castle from a Hans Christian Andersen story, he would soon learn to hate the castle as a POW camp. He noted the castle had foul smelling hogs in the moat. The manner of the guards upon arrival was rough and very unpleasant when compared to other camps and the discipline was unusual and severe. Foster described the sleeping quarters as a former Banqueting Hall used as a dormitory. This dormitory was at the top of a spiral staircase and this room had very bad lighting. The lighting in the room came from four fifteen watt bulbs. The room consisted of many double bunk beds. The camp was closed in February 1941 but reopened in July when it was used for housing RAF and British Army officers. Many of the prisoners were temporarily transported to Torun, Poland in this time frame.

On 3 September 1941 three RAF officers, Dominic Bruce, Peter Tunstall and Eustace Newborn, escaped disguised as members of a civilian Swiss Red Cross Commission. They passed through the gate and then, wearing faked Luftwaffe uniforms, headed to an airfield near Kassel intending to steal a Ju 52, which Newborn had flown before the war, and fly home. Unfortunately, they were detected before they could start the plane, so they decided to find another less well guarded aerodrome. After ten days, they were challenged by a former Spangenberg guard and arrested.

The Germans marched the prisoners east on March 29, 1945, and some 25 escaped as they left the castle (see Eric Foster's autobiography). The Americans liberated the camp's inmates at Lengefeld unterm Stein on 4 April. Spangenberg Castle was destroyed by American bombs after Oflag IX A/H had left.

== Notable prisoners ==
The following prisoners are known to have been housed at the camp:;

- Pilot Officer Anthony Barber, No. 1 Photographic Reconnaissance Unit, RAF. Future Chancellor of the Exchequer.
- Flight Lieutenant Dominic Bruce, No. 9 Squadron, RAF. Colditz escaper.
- Flight Lieutenant Aidan Crawley, RAF. Future author, journalist and MP.
- Wing Commander Harry Day, No. 57 Squadron, RAF. Great Escape survivor.
- Major General Victor Fortune G.O.C 51st (Highland) Division. Captured at St Valery in June 1940. Senior POW British officer in Germany. Despite declining health, refused to be repatriated. Knighted after his release for his work to promote welfare of British POWs. Building of cricket pitch at Spangenberg, organised under his direction.
- Lieutenant Colonel John Frost, 2nd Battalion, Parachute Regiment. Captured in the Battle of Arnhem.
- Captain Guy Griffiths, 803 Naval Air Squadron. Stalag Luft III forger.
- Wing Commander Joseph Kayll, No. 607 Squadron, RAF. Battle of Britain ace.
- Lieutenant George Lane, X Troop, No. 10 (Inter-Allied) Commando. Captured during Operation Tarbrush.
- Lieutenant Airey Neave, Royal Artillery. Colditz escaper and MP.
- Pilot officer Eustace Charles Newborn. Captured Gazala, escapee and future medical obstetrician.
- Squadron Leader Brian Paddon, No. 40 Squadron, RAF. Colditz escaper.
- Flying Officer Oliver Philpot, No. 42 Squadron RAF. "Wooden Horse" escaper.
- Major Bruce Shand, 7th Armoured Division. Captured in the Western Desert Campaign. Father of Queen Camilla, second wife of King Charles III.
- Lieutenant Colonel Brian Duncan Shaw. Veteran of both world wars and chemistry lecturer at the University of Nottingham.
- Major Dickie Stewart, Border Regiment, 1st Airlanding Brigade. Captured in the Battle of Arnhem.
- William Francis Kynaston Thompson OBE, captured on 20 September 1944 during Market Garden
- Wing Commander Robert Stanford Tuck, No. 257 Squadron, RAF. Battle of Britain ace.
- Squadron Leader Pete Tunstall, No. 61 Squadron, RAF. Serial escaper and Colditz POW.
- Pilot Officer Howard Wardle, No. 218 Squadron RAF. Colditz escaper.
- Bill "Tiger" Watson, 2 Commando. Participant in Operation Chariot, the raid on the Saint-Nazaire drydock.
- Lt/Col AC Newman VC, Commanding Officer of No2 Commando. Was in command of the Commandos who took part in the St Nazaire Raid
- Major WO Copland DSO 2/ic of No2 Commando. He commanded the troops on board HMS Campbelltown at St Nazaire.
- Capt RK Montgomery RE MC Was in control of the demolitions in the dock area at St Nazaire.
- Lt Corran Purdon MC. His party blew up the Northern Winding House at St Nazaire. He escaped from Spangenberg and ended up in Colditz.
- Micky Burn, 2 Commando. Participant in Operation Chariot, for which he was awarded the Military Cross. Later transferred to Colditz.
- Donald "The Laird" Roy, 2 Commando. Participant in Operation Chariot, for which he was awarded the Distinguished Service Order (DSO). Escaped but captured and returned after 10 days.
- Captain Ernest Edmunds Vaughan, DCM, IMS (Indian Medical Service) previously held in P.G. 12 Vincigliata, near Florence Italy.
- Captain John William Morton Mansel, Camp Forger. Helped Airey Neave, amongst others, escape

== See also ==
- List of prisoner-of-war camps in Germany
