= Pfieffe =

Pfieffe may refer to:

- Pfieffe, Spangenberg, a district of Spangenberg, a town in Hesse, Germany
- Pfieffe (Fulda), a river of Hesse, Germany, tributary of the Fulda
