= Swiss Red Cross Commission escape =

1941 WW2 escape from Spangenberg castle

The Swiss Red Cross Commission escape occurred in 1941 at Schloss Spangenberg, involving Dominic Bruce, Eustace Newborn and Pete Tunstall, all prisoners of war (POWs), held at the castle. It has been described as the most audacious escape of World War II. Bruce's Military Cross (MC) citation described it as a "very clever escape."

In late July and early August 1941, Bruce, Newborn and Tunstall, took an interest in the architecture of the building, suspecting there may be escaping materials. The three broke into a flat in the Schloss thought to belong to a forestry principal and inside the flat the trio obtained escape material such as disguises, maps and a compass. After sourcing the escape resources, they carefully crafted an escape plan that took advantage of the incompetent gate security of the castle, intending to walk to Kassel, break into Fliegerhorst Kassel, steal an aircraft and then fly to Basel.

Patiently waiting many weeks for the conditions to be just right for the escape, on 3 September 1941 the trio brazenly walked across the moat bridge, posing as a German officer (Tunstall) and two doctors (Bruce and Newborn) of a Swiss Red Cross inspection team. Upon reaching the bottom of the hill outside of the castle's grounds, they quickly removed their Swiss Commission disguises and then made their way to Kassel, dressed as Luftwaffe airmen, aiming to steal an aircraft.

Subsequently, after a turn of unfortunate events, they were forced to change their plans. As such, the three decided to walk onwards towards the Belgian border. On their tenth day on the road, they were recaptured by an off duty guard from Spangenberg, who recognised Tunstall. Following their capture, Bruce, Newborn and Tunstall were interrogated by the Gestapo and sentenced to 53 days in solitude. The escape by the trio, which revealed the short-comings of the castle's ability to handle prisoners of war, is thought to be a reason why Schloss Spangenberg was evacuated in late 1941.

== Prologue to the Swiss Red Cross Commission ==
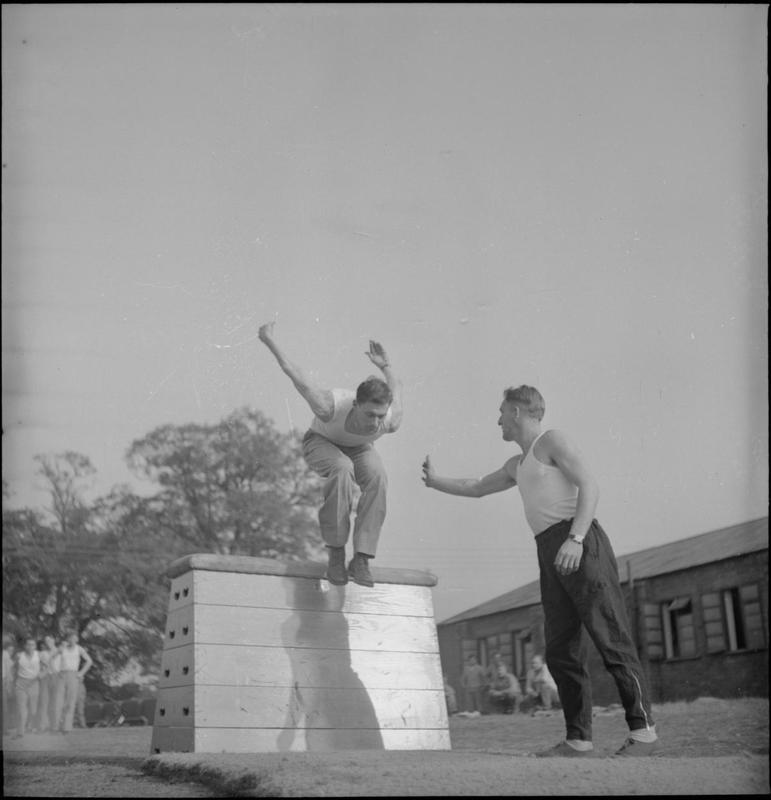
A "wooden horse", as seen in a US Army rehabilitation centre; UK, 1943.

It has been argued that Bruce and Tunstall are the original innovators of the wooden horse escape technique.

Along with Eustace Newborn and Peter Tunstall, Bruce came up with the escape plan now known as "the Swiss Red Cross Commission." Tunstall, also highlights that in 1941, prior to him and Bruce planning an escape with the famed "Swiss Red Cross Commission", he and Bruce had been digging an escape route with a wooden horse tunnel from inside the gymnasium. The wooden horse was placed roughly four feet from the wall that separated the gym from the moat. The digging was a very slow process; it required the removal of spoil, bricks and stone work, and was aided by other prisoners distracting the guards. They were later joined by Douglas "Sammy" Hoare and a syndicate who were promised a second go if they escaped undiscovered. Other members of this syndicate were also named as: Harry Bewlay, John Milner and Eustace Newborn.

When Bruce and Tunstall noted the slow process they began examining the rest of the castle and left the digging to the other team involving Sammy Hoare. The tunnel almost reached completion but unfortunately the digging team got caught when a guard become suspicious at the large stones that were accumulating outside of the gym. The guard then called a search, and then found the escape tunnel. When the guards found the shaft they called an Appell and Hauptmann Schmidt confidently stated to the prisoners, "It is impossible to escape by tunnel or any other way."

This wooden horse gym escape tunnel was two years prior to the famed Sagan wooden horse escape. Tunstall stated that he would like to think some of the watchers and workers who helped on their original wooden horse escape may have mentioned it from time to time; and would like to think that their idea contributed to the success of the effort at Sagan.

== Exploration of the castle ==
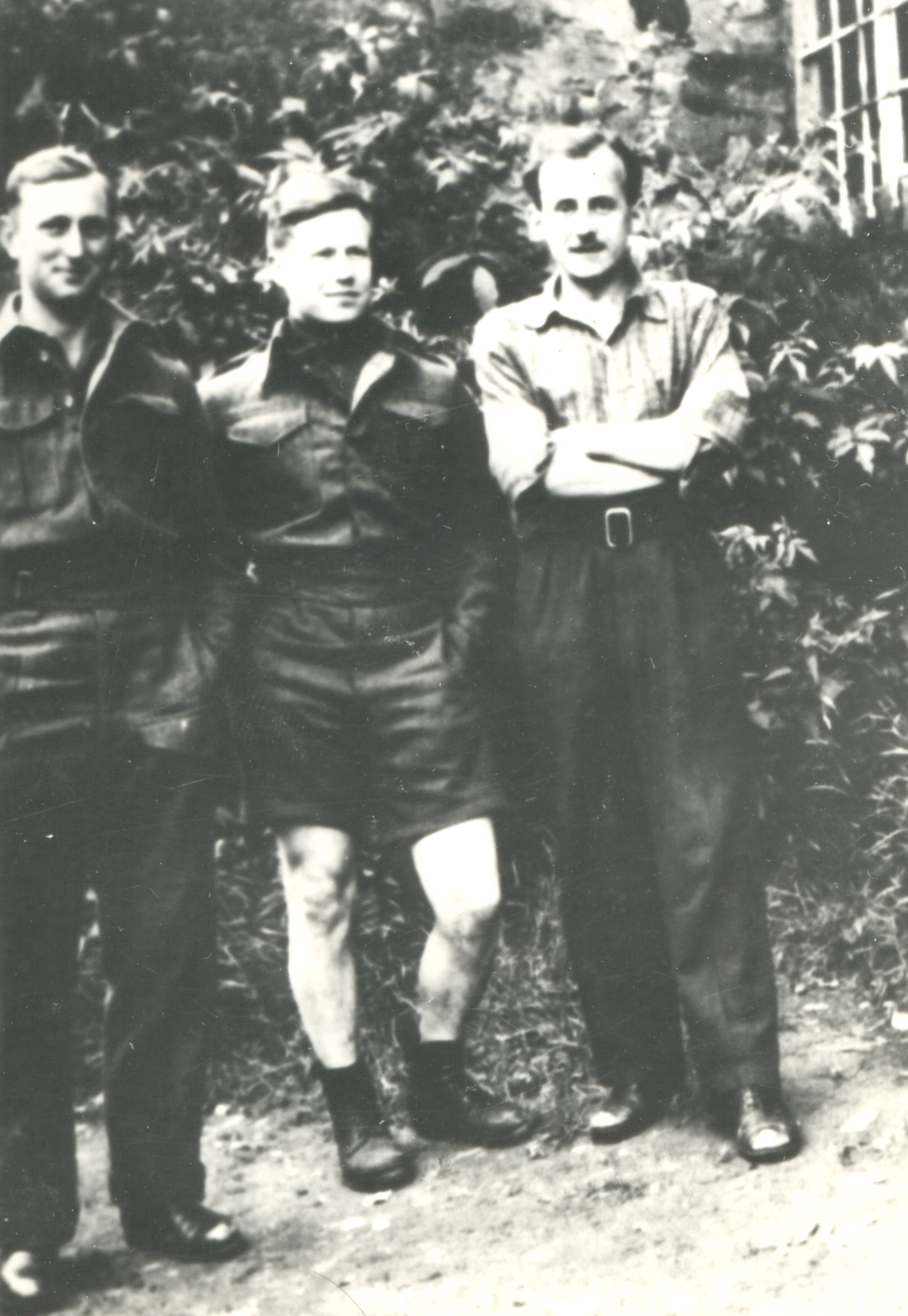
Bruce (on right) during his imprisonment in Spangenberg

Whilst the wooden horse tunnel was being dug, Bruce and Tunstall, were planning, after they had escaped from the castle grounds, to steal an aircraft from Kassel airfield to fly to Basel, Switzerland. To do this they also created Luftwaffe uniforms. As the tunnel was being dug by other prisoners, Bruce and Tunstall were also in the process of exploring the castle and keeping their options open for other escape possibilities in case the tunnel route was found. At this time, Bruce and Tunstall got to know a new prisoner called Eustace Newborn who was in the wooden horse tunnel syndicate. Newborn was a South African airman with plenty of experience flying Junkers Ju 52 and Junkers Ju 86 airplanes. Needing his experience with Junkers Ju 52 airplanes, Newborn joined their escape team. In the escape it was decided Tunstall, who could speak better German, would be a Feldwebel and Bruce and Newborn would be privates.

Bruce, Newborn and Tunstall also wanted to explore a walled off flat. Inside the daily hustle of the castle and at the same time as Bruce, Newborn and Tunstall were planning on exploring a flat, Eric Foster and Joe Barker, who were planning a laundry cart escape, were taking a similar interest in the impressive architecture of the building. Though their interest was for the first floor of the building, not the same flat that interested Bruce, Newborn and Tunstall. At this moment in time, both groups did not know that they each had a keen interest in this area of the castle. Foster claims in his book it was "bad form" for want-to-be escapees to ask upfront questions about planned escapes involving other groups.

The flat that interested Bruce, Newborn and Tunstall had once been explored by a French lieutenant named Merlin, who had broken into the flat in 1939. It was rumoured the previous occupant of this apartment was a forestry school principal who was now at the front for Germany. They eventually found a way into this flat via a chamber found at the top of the staircase which had a plaster ceiling. This chamber led to the attic. They broke through this plaster ceiling in the chamber with a four foot long metal-pole that they claimed could break through anything and that they affectionately pun-named Napoleon. At first sight inside the attic Bruce, Newborn and Tunstall noticed a shadowy silhouette staring back at them, and this frightened them. The silhouette turned out to be a bust of Emperor Franz Josef on a plinth. From the attic they found a staircase down to the principals flat. Bruce and Tunstall picked the locked door at the bottom of the stairs. Inside the room they found escape material such as civilian clothes, officer uniforms, guns including a Luger pistol, maps, a compass, cases and stale cigars. Upon sourcing these materials Bruce and Tunstall then gave up their wooden horse tunnel escape completely and left it all to Hoare. Instead they began solely focussing on the bridge and gate security. Unfortunately the gate security had been increased because of a 1940 escape from the castle by three Canadians, Keith Milne, Don Middleton and Hank Wardle.

== Gate security ==
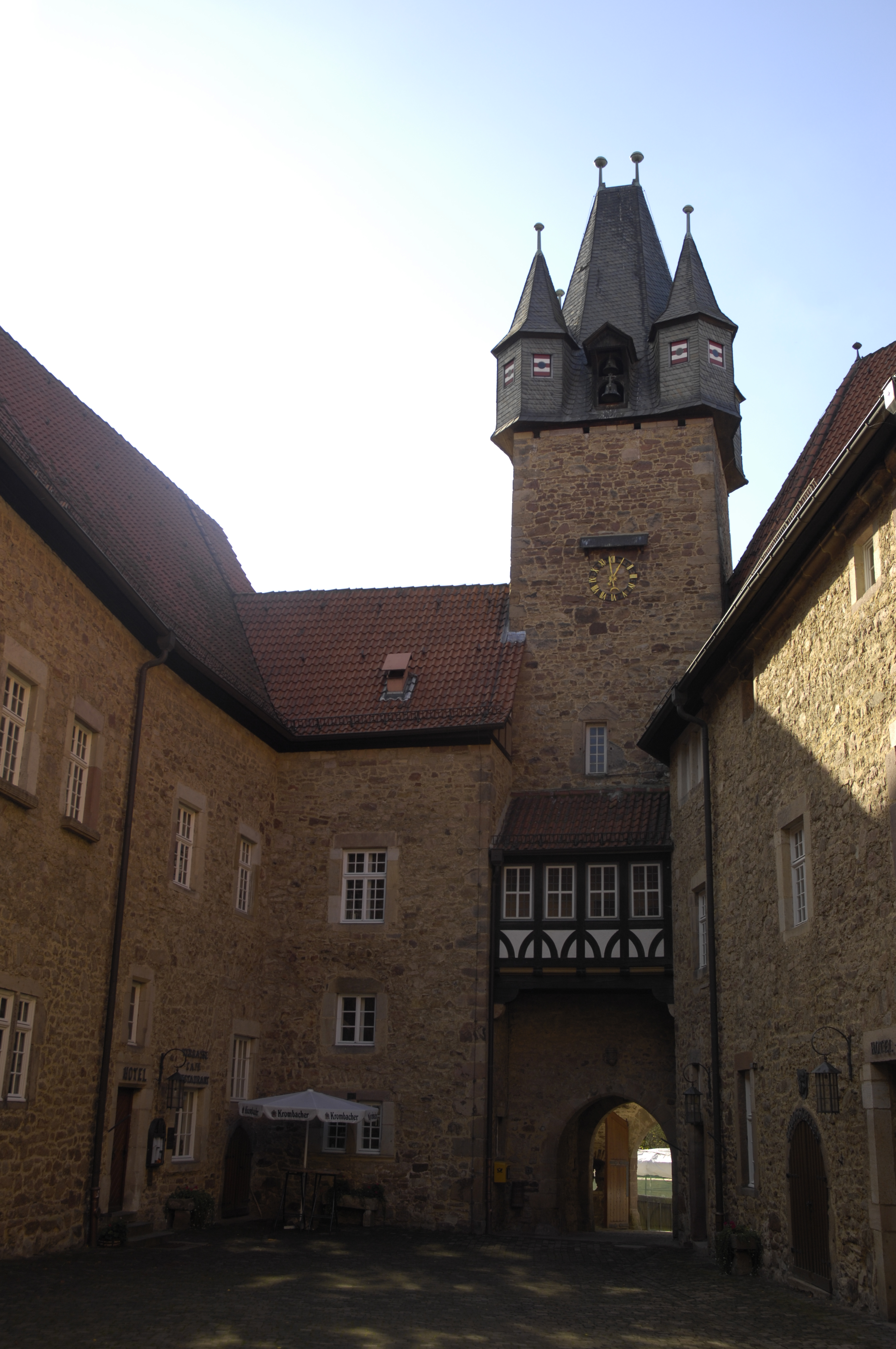
The inner court yard looking towards the gate as seen in 2009

There were three companies working the castle gate. Tunstall called them, "A company", "B company" and "C company". Each company worked shifts. All staff rotated their roles and sometimes a staff member would be the sentry on the castle side of the bridge who opened the gate. There could be ten other posts a guard could be on.

The guard commander was on the other side of the bridge away from the castle. The sentry on the castle side of the bridge was to open and close the gate on command. To let people into the castle the sentry could only open the gate after an order that could only come from the guard commander, and this order would come after the guard commander had signed the people in. To let people out of the castle, the sentry, would blow a whistle, and the guard commander would come through the gate to sign the people out, then following a command, the sentry would then open the gate. Over time, they observed the C company Feldwebel was the least meticulous of the three companies and that there was no chance of escape if A company and B company had a shift, being they followed the protocol to the letter.

They worked out that C company had two big flaws that could be exploited. They noticed the guard commander did not bother with the protocol when the orderlies went to the moat to feed the pigs potato peelings and rubbish from the kitchen, this left the gate open. They also pinpointed the weak link in the C company team. Tunstall called the guard "Blockhead". They believed he would be the least alert enough of the guards to notice their faces when they were in disguise.

== Escape plan and the Luger pistol debate ==
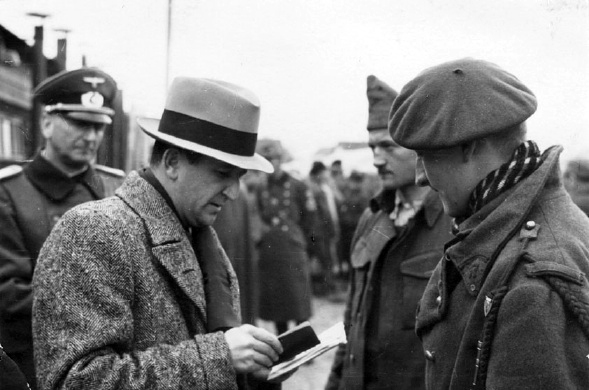
Marcel Junod, delegate of the ICRC, visiting POWs in Germany. Bruce's attire would have been similar.

They hid all the gear needed for the escape in the sick bay. They decided the escape would revolve around the three being disguised as a visiting Swiss Red Cross Commission inspection team. It was planned that on the day of escape, Tunstall would be dressed as an army Hauptmann. They would carry an ID card which was no more than a touched up fishing license with an official seal, and Bruce and Newborn would be dressed as visiting doctors. Bruce and Newborn would be very well dressed, carrying dispatch cases. Bruce would also be wearing a Homburg hat and smoking a cigar. Newborn would be wearing a Tyrolean hat. Underneath the attire they would be each wearing their Luftwaffe uniforms. They also had a debate about carrying the Luger pistol. Bruce and Tunstall were in favour of carrying the gun for the sake of authenticity. Newborn, along with a prisoner called Joe Kayll were strongly against it, arguing they could not expect the protection of the Geneva Convention while carrying it. The argument was in turn settled by the SBO – Brigadier Somerset who strictly forbade them taking the Luger with them. Bruce, Newborn and Tunstall then settled on building a replica using wood and lead stripped from the roof. They polished and blued the replica until it looked perfect. The escape was planned to be "shit or bust", and as such the cases only carried three rations. More important to the three was boot polish, shaving equipment which would keep them presentable as Luftwaffe airmen, and the local map and compass.

Bruce and Tunstall estimated their escape from the castle grounds depended on these three things, pig feeding time leaving the gate to the bridge open, Blockhead being on the gate and C company being on the afternoon shift. They waited a long time for these conditions to occur, waiting all through August. These conditions in turn rested on Blockhead failing a gullibility test. The plan was for this test to be performed by a prisoner called John Milner who spoke good German. The planned test was to see if Blockhead would bluff. In German, Milner would ask Blockhead if the German officer and the two Swiss doctors had left the castle. If Blockhead bluffed this question, he failed the test and this would probably mean he assumed a Swiss Commission team was inside the castle. If he bluffed, Milner would give a thumbs-up from behind his back and this thumbs-up would mean the escape plan would kick into action. If Blockhead passed the test, Milner would give a thumbs-down signal from behind his back and the escape would not go ahead.

Upon the thumbs-up sign the kitchen orderlies would immediately go to the door with their kitchen rubbish. It was always predicted Blockhead and C company would always open the gate to the orderlies to allow the orderlies to feed the pigs with rubbish from the kitchen. At this point, when the gate was predicted to be left open by Blockhead, they devised to immerse Blockhead in a social orchestration. They arranged for: Blockhead to be blustered and overwhelmed by his perceptions; they scheduled deftly timed goon baiting from the orderlies at the gate to overwhelm him; and timed for a perception of urgency from Swiss Commission inspection team and the Army Hauptmann, to rush him.

Prior to walking through the gate, the faux Swiss commission team would be seen having chats with the British medical officers to help with the frame. Upon reaching the gate they had lined up for Tunstall to state in German to Bruce, right in front of Blockhead, "Du lieber Gott, Herr Doktor, schon viertel zwei. Kommen, wir müssen weitergehen!" ("Good God, Doctor, it’s already a quarter to two. We must hurry!").

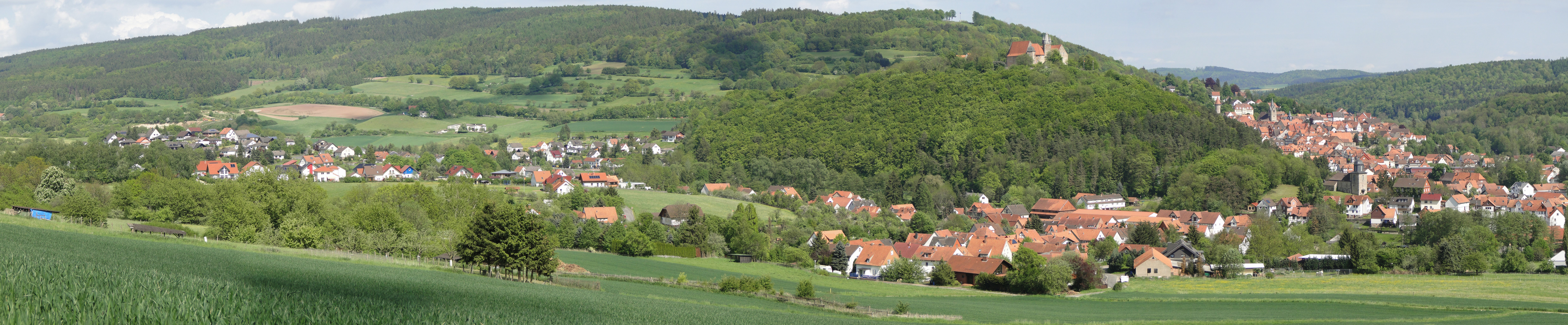
Spangenberg itself is right on the image with the castle on the hill of Schloßberg (centre right). The hilly terrain and countryside around Spangenberg, as seen in 2010. Bruce, Newborn and Tunstall would have experienced a similar terrain on their way to Kassel.

Upon exiting the castle security they planned on heading down the hill. At the bottom of the hill they planned on removing and hiding their Swiss commission clothes. They arranged to walk to the forest on their way to Kassel, dressed as Luftwaffe airmen, knowing the guards would eventually be searching for two civilians and an army Hauptmann. They also organised for a white smoke signal. The white signal would come from the kitchen. This white smoke would warn Bruce, Tunstall and Newborn that the guards are now searching for them.

== Spangenberg gate escape ==
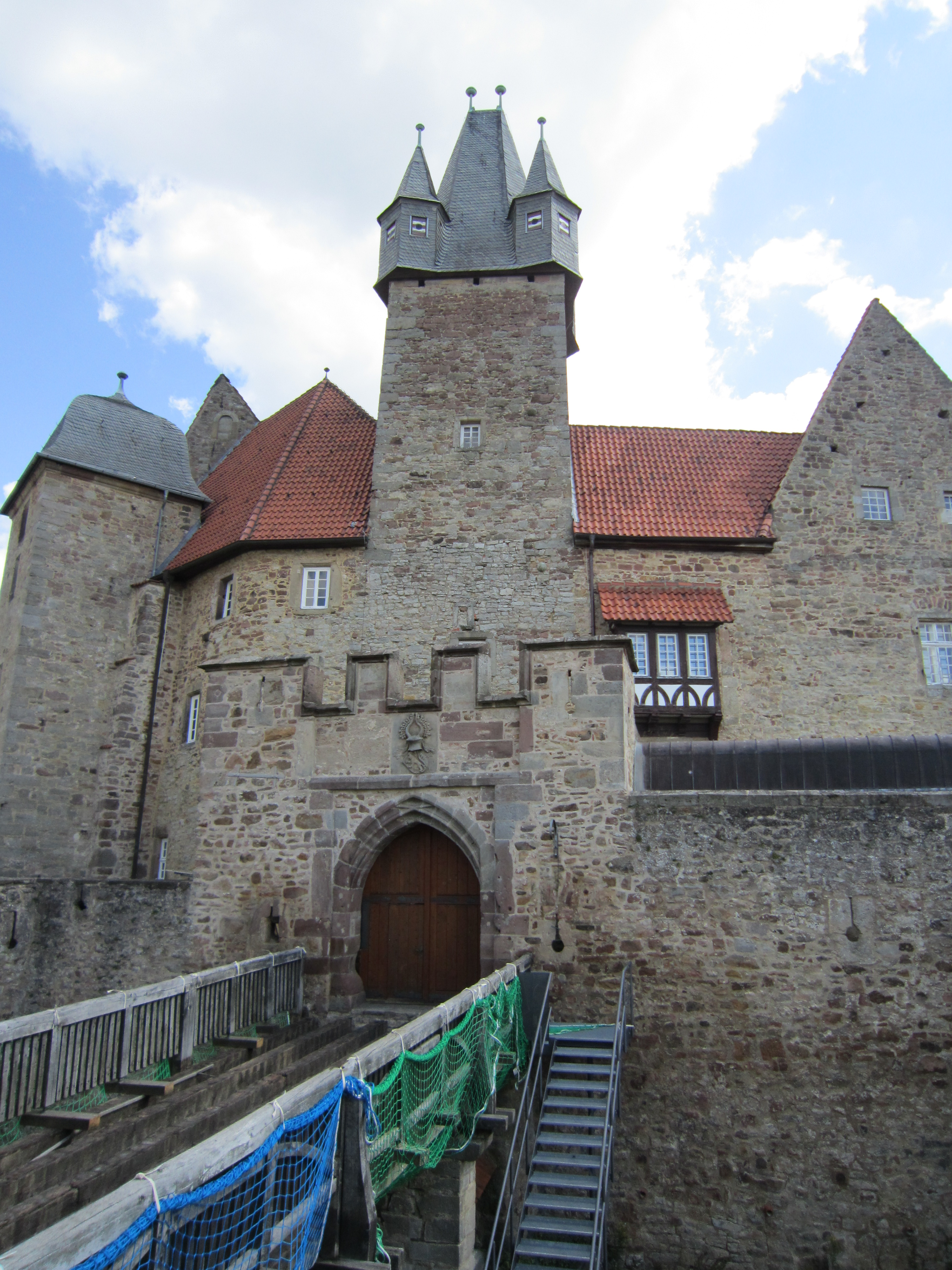
Bruce, Newborn and Tunstall walked across the bridge dressed as a Swiss Red Cross inspection team

External image
- John Watton's painting of the "Spangenberg Gate" escape.

The escape plan to escape the castle grounds worked. Milner tested the guard Blockhead and Milner gave the thumbs up. Bruce, disguised as a doctor, conversed with the British medical officers to help frame Blockheads confusion, with Bruce being perceptually harassed on some critical points, by the medical officers. The orderlies goon baited Blockhead at the gate, the Hauptmann (Tunstall) then marched to the gate in a hurry and stated to Bruce, "Du lieber Gott, Herr Doktor, schon viertel zwei. Kommen, wir müssen weitergehen!" Blockhead even saluted the Hauptmann (Tunstall). Tunstall walked by and walked through the gate, and Bruce and Newborn, carrying dispatch cases, with Bruce, a non-smoker, insouciantly smoking a cigar (a rarity by this period of the war; and convincing evidence for the guards that the visitor was Swiss), followed him over the bridge.

== A witness of the gate escape ==
On 25 August 1941 Foster and Barker were successful with their, almost air tight, laundry basket escape, though they eventually got recaptured. From his solitary cell window in Spangenberg Foster witnessed Bruce, Newborn and Tunstall walking over the draw bridge. Foster seen and heard the craft from Bruce, Newborn and Tunstall. He observed Tunstall stating to Bruce and Newborn, in front of the guards, the time and how they must hurry. He heard either Bruce or Newborn state in German, "Come on Doctor get a move on!" He then observed Bruce showing the fishing ID license to the guards, to which he deliberately dropped and then picked up again in order to obfuscate the imperfections of the documentation. He explained the hurried perception effect was good. He was impressed with their chicanery. Foster then observed the trio walking down the stone stairway, instead of walking down the narrow spiral road. He then lost sight of the trio as they made their nervy journey to Kassel - a strong military centre.

Tunstall explained, the guards at the other end of the bridge saluted at the Hauptmann as they made it over the bridge on their way out of the castle grounds. Though Kassel is a right turn from the exit of the castle, exiting the grounds they turned left before they set on their way to Kassel and made their way to the bottom of the hill, where they removed and hid their commission disguises. They then chose one of two roads that led from the castle, and marched to Kassel, along Melsunger Straße, dressed as Luftwaffe airmen.

== On to Kassel ==
In their escape plan there was only one thing that did not come off, at the bottom of the hill they did not see the white smoke warning that came from the kitchen, warning them the security team was searching for them. There were also some close calls on the way to the forest. When on an open road heading towards the forest, search parties drove past them, even asking Bruce, Tunstall and Newborn if they had seen three escapees dressed as the Swiss Commission inspection team, causing some mild anxiety. Along the route, after walking openly through the streets saluting with German officers, they gained confidence their disguises were working. After the close call with the search squad, they reached the forest. Very relieved that they reached the shade of the forest, Tunstall explained that Bruce, Newborn and Tunstall then come across the threat of a group of wild boars. The three, noting the wild boars with tusks in the moat at Spangenberg, had been previously institutionalized and given information from the guards about the violence of the wild boar. The bigger male boar, with sharp tusks, was flipping soil with his snout, and eyeballing them. As such, they discussed making a safe detour route around the group. According to Tunstall, Bruce became impatient, and then picked up a walking stick, broke the conditioning, then walked over to the pigs, the pigs then harmlessly moved away before Bruce arrived. He then leaned with the stick and waited for Newborn and Tunstall to catch up. In disbelief, Newborn and Tunstall made an excuse for their hesitancy. Newborn a South African, alongside Tunstall, then began justifying their positions by jokingly talking about the African warthog, talking about the merits of the warthog, how you can't be too careful as these African pigs were noted for their fury, and how these wild hogs regularly busted car tyres with their tusks.

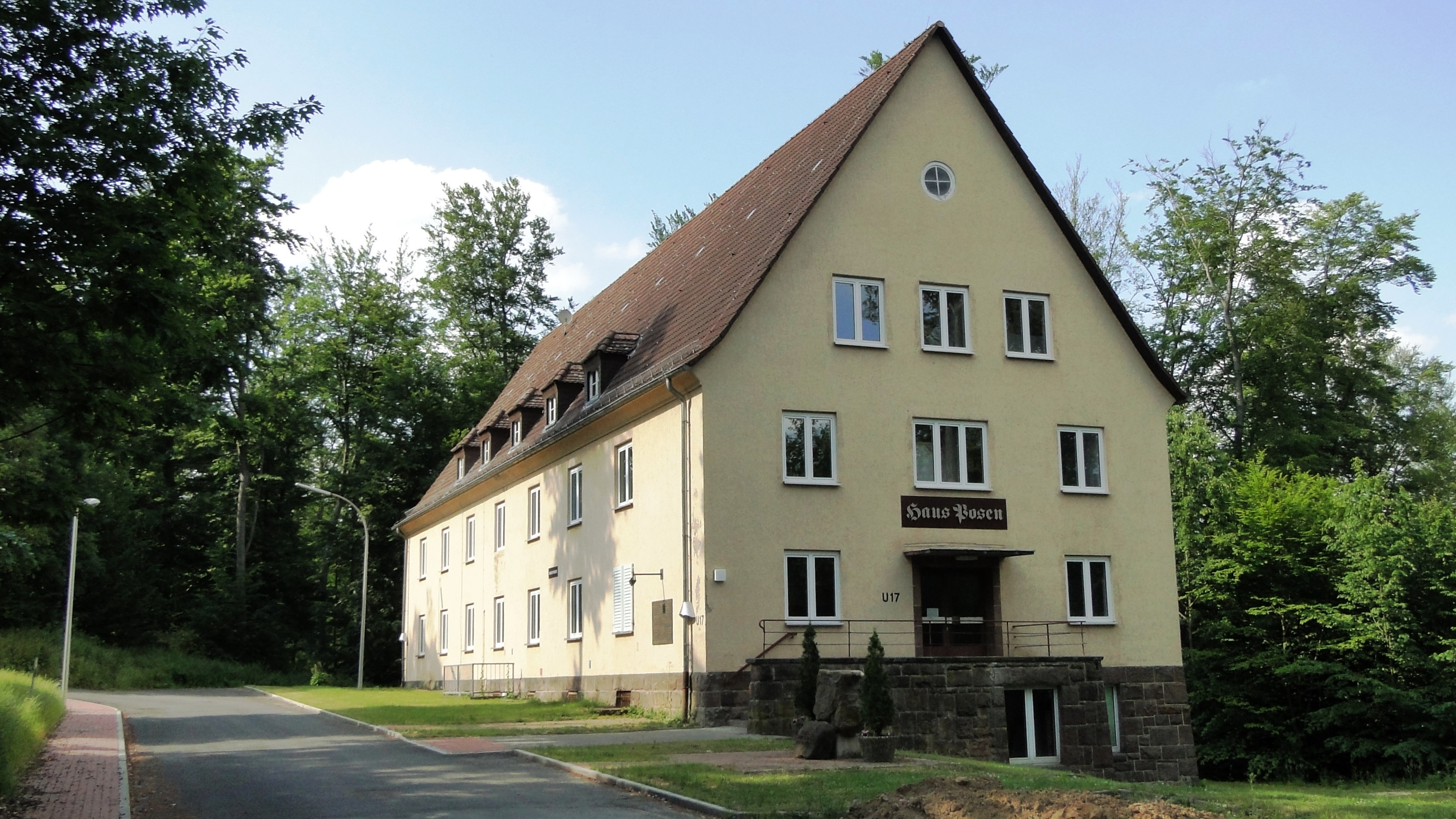
Haus Posen in 2015. A building in Kassel airfield.

They reached the airfield the next day. At Kassel airfield they intended to steal a Junkers Ju 52, which Newborn had flown before the war, and then fly to Basel Switzerland.They penetrated the aerodrome. Whilst inside the aerodrome, they were impeded by a suspicious officer, of superior rank to the Feldwebel, who asked them to stop. They evaded the suspicious officer after Tunstall shouted a few phrases at him. The phrases explained to the officer they were in a hurry. The three then marched purposely into a building. Inside the building they saluted the administration staff and walked through an exit on the other side of the building. This manoeuvre stopped the officer of superior rank trailing them. They then approached the airfield. On the airfield, they were discovered trying to start a Luftwaffe aircraft, so they decided to find another aerodrome that was less heavily guarded near the Belgian frontier. They now had to adjust their plans. In the adjustment of the plans, they decided it was better to travel in plain sight and in daylight with their Luftwaffe uniforms, whilst saluting and using colloquial phrases, instead of going cross country, and getting their uniforms dirty. Whilst on the road from Kassel, unknown to Bruce, Newborn and Tunstall, every police and military unit in German-occupied Europe had been informed of the escape of an army Hauptmann and two civilians from Spangenberg castle. As the escape was originally planned as "shit or bust" and they had packed limited rations, they decided they had to live off the land where possible, aiming to eat apples, plums and pears stolen from trees and by eating crops out of the soil. To the laughter of Bruce and Newborn, Tunstall, stole three loaves of bread from a horse and cart whilst matching the horses gallop, and painfully crouching to stay out of the sight-line of the driver.

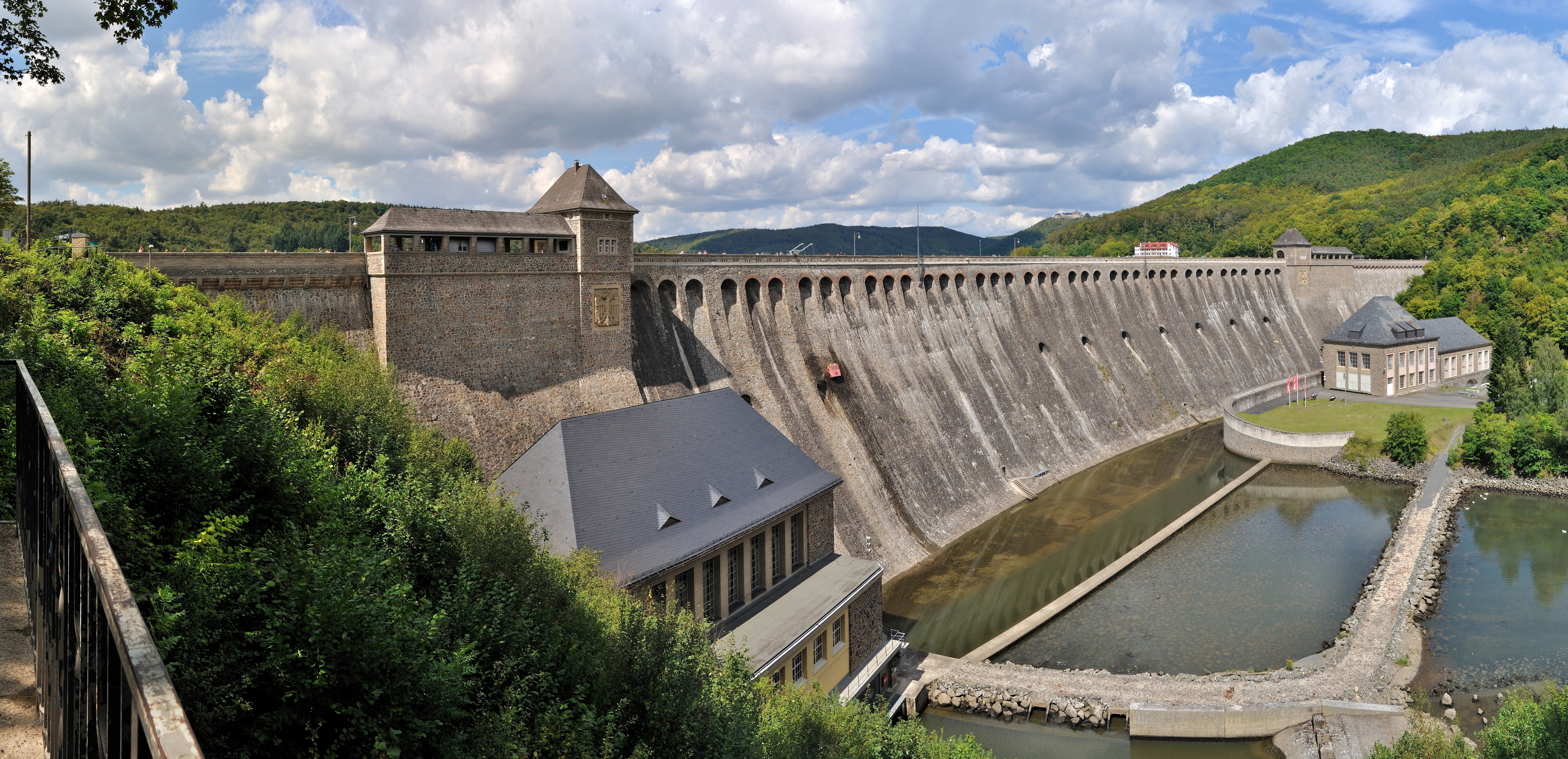
Eder Dam as seen in August 2011

On the second day from Kassel, Bruce, Tunstall and Newborn marched alongside the River Eder and came across the scenic sight of the Eder Dam. This visit would be one and a half years before the dam-busters raid involving Guy Gibson. Gibson's raid would rupture the dam.

On the march Tunstall explained the three were approached by some women. As they could not hold a conversation in German this raised anxiety they could immediately be caught. Tunstall explained to the women that they must not speak to them. The women asked "warum" (why). Tunstall mentioned, "they are under arrest." Bruce caught on quickly, and Tunstall claims Bruce then leered at them and did the "finest brutal-and-licentious-soldiery act you can imagine." In the IWM tapes Bruce expands on this. He relates how one morning (after a night sheltering under cover on farmland) they woke up to an audience of German land girls. They questioned Tunstall as to why the trio were travelling in such an unorthodox fashion. Tunstall, in an effort to allay their suspicions, claimed that he and Newborn were taking their prisoner Bruce to a military prison. The women asked what crimes Bruce had committed. As a prank, Bruce leered at the girls and replied "unmentionable sexual practices" – upon which they ran away in alarm.

After ten days on the road, near a small prison camp used for farm labour, they were arrested by a soldier who followed them on a bike with another guard and a civilian. This soldier, who just three weeks previously worked as a guard at Spangenberg, recognised Tunstall.

== Interrogated by the Gestapo ==
Bruce, Tunstall and Newborn were taken many miles to Frankenberg on the river Eder and interrogated by the Gestapo. During WWII, the Gestapo were notorious for not verifying information and sending people to concentration camps. Not much was known about the Gestapo in 1941. Tunstall described how even the Wehrmacht, who had transported them, become anxious at the malevolent presence of the Gestapo. Tunstall wanted to get out of the presence of the softly spoken Gestapo interrogator as soon as possible. When Tunstall was answering his questions, Bruce and Newborn looked at Tunstall with disdain, consequentially, when Bruce and Newborn were interrogated, they instead, approached the questioning from the interrogator with disrespect. Tunstall believes had the same situation happened just three years later, Bruce's and Newborn's approach could have been fatal.

== Solitary confinement ==
They were then sent back to Spangenberg. Hauptmann Schmidt was incensed at the audacity of the escape. The three were each held to a long period in solitary confinement. The trio each received 53 days in solitude for the Spangenberg Castle escape, which was longer than the Geneva convention suggested. In Spangenberg they were not sentenced for their escape but held in preventative arrest. The Senior British Officer also complained that according to the Geneva convention guidelines, the exercise yard in Spangenberg was too small, and they needed to be moved to another camp.

=== Defying solitude with a card school ===
In solitary confinement, Bruce, Newborn and Tunstall were placed in three separate cells in front of, and high above, the moat they had previously escaped from. The approach by C company to Bruce, Newborn and Tunstall was different to A and B company. When compared to C company, A and B company treat Bruce, Newborn and Tunstall with good humour. To the amusement of Bruce, Newborn, and Tunstall, in the remaining cell, Blockhead was also doing his time in confinement for letting the fake inspection team through the gate.

Whilst they were held in confinement, they even managed to defy solitude after Bruce picked the lock on his, Newborn's and Tunstall's cell doors in order that they might join him in his cell to play poker with a set of home made cards a previous occupant had left behind. When caught out by the guard who had noted that there was three to a cell, Tunstall claimed, Bruce, Newborn and himself smiled and nodded at the puzzled and curious guard as if they were innocent, this was harmless, and as if the guard was a juvenile who had just completed a simple comprehension test. The guard, upon realising they had the nerve to break the solitary punishment, blew his top. For the breaking of the solitude, Bruce was eventually court-martialled on the serious military charge of breaking free from arrest, the other two eventually got five extra days solitude. Tunstall explained he thought Bruce eventually got away with it by Bruce explaining escaping was not a court-martial offence for a POW, according to the Geneva Convention.

Inside of solitary, Tunstall claims, early on, there were rumours of Bruce, Tunstall and Newborn being shot. After nearly eight weeks, the whole camp was made to move; Bruce, Tunstall and Newborn were rumoured to be, and expected to be, sent straight to the Colditz Straflager (punishment camp), instead, they were sent to Warburg. This immediate move was a hindrance to Bruce and Tunstall as they had been formulating two more escape plans. Tunstall mentions that on the journey to Warburg there was a flurry of train jumpers.

== See also ==
- June 1962 Alcatraz escape attempt
- Maze Prison escape
- Stalag Luft Great escape
- The "Wooden Horse" and escape

== Sources ==
Books

- Foster, Eric (1 February 1992). Life Hangs by a Silken Thread: An Autobiography by Squadron Leader. England: Astia Publishing. ISBN 978-0951898307.
- Rollings, Charles (26 November 2003). Wire and Walls: RAF Prisoners of War in Itzehoe, Spangenberg and Thorn 1939-42. United Kingdom: Ian Allan Publishing. ISBN 978-0711029910.
- Rollings, Charles (1 September 2004). Wire and Worse: RAF Prisoners of War in Laufen, Bibarach, Lubeck and Warburg 1940-42. Vol. 2. United Kingdom: Ian Allan Publishing. ISBN 978-0711030503.
- Tunstall, Peter (2014). The Last Escaper. London, UK: Duckworth. ISBN 978-0-71564-923-7.

Museum artefacts

- Bruce, Brendan (1999). "Bruce, Dominic (Oral history); (Catalogue number 22332)". iwm.org.uk. Imperial War Museum.
- Windle, Dave (1 June 2006). "Bruce, Dominic (Oral history); (Catalogue number 29172)". iwm.org.uk. Imperial War Museum; Colditz Society.

Newspapers & journals

- Battle, Ken (2 July 2018). "Flt. Lt. Dominic Bruce, AFM, MC, OBE". Sunbury Matters & Sunbury; Shepperton Local History Society. Sunbury: villagematters.co.uk.

Websites

- TOW (2018). "Bruce, Dominic". www.tracesofwar.com. Traces of War.
- de Meester, Wim (15 November 2018). "Crash No 107" (PDF). db.wingstovictory.nl. Airwar Museum Netherlands.
