= Brian Paddon =

- Born: 24 August 1908; Carshalton, Surrey, England
- Died: 21 February 1967 (aged 58); Rhodesia
- Military career
- Allegiance: (United Kingdom) British Empire
- Branch: Royal Air Force
- Service years: 1929 - 1950
- Rank: Group Captain
- Nickname: 'Never A Dull Moment'
- Service number: 28097
- Units: No. 4 Squadron RAF; No. 20 Squadron RAF; No. 24 Squadron RAF; No. 209 Squadron RAF; No. 40 Squadron RAF
- Commands: No. 40 Squadron RAF; RAF Thornaby
- Conflicts: World War II: Battle of France
- Awards: Distinguished Service Order

Group Captain Brian Paddon DSO (24 August 1908 – 21 February 1967) was a Royal Air Force pilot who became a prisoner of war and successfully escaped from Colditz Castle during the Second World War.

== Early life ==
Paddon was born in Carshalton, Surrey, the son of the Reverend Charles Salmon Paddon and his wife, Nellie Symington Paddon. In the 1911 Census of Redruth in Cornwall, Paddon, aged two, lives with his parents at Lannarth Vicarage.

== Royal Air Force service ==
Paddon joined the RAF on a short service commission as a pilot officer (on probation) in June 1929. He obtained his Royal Aero Club Aviator's Licence #10796 on 3 September 1932.

Paddon was shot down flying Bristol Blenheim L8827 of No. 40 Squadron RAF during an attack at Saint-Valéry-en-Caux on 6 June 1940 as part of the Battle of France. He was captured and became a prisoner of war.

== Prisoner of war ==
After passing through the interrogation and transit camp of Dulag luft, he was first sent to Oflag IX-A/H at Spangenberg, before shortly afterwards leaving for Stalag Luft I at Barth, arriving there on 12 July 1940, where he became the Senior British Officer.

After several escape attempts from various camps, he was sent to Oflag IV-C at Colditz Castle, arriving there on 14 May 1941 with three other officers, including Airey Neave.

After several more attempts to escape, on 11 June 1942, he was sent to a court-martial at Stalag XX-A for insulting a German officer during one of his previous escape attempts. However, he managed to escape from his cell, and with the aid of other British prisoners of war, left the camp with a work party by picking up a ladder and placing it on his shoulder, slipped away and travelled to Danzig. He didn't put the ladder down. No one stopped him. [Source: personal family stories handed down through the generations]. He stowed away on a Swedish ship and reached neutral Sweden on 18 June. He returned to the UK on 6 August 1942.

He was awarded the Distinguished Service Order and promoted to group captain. He was also awarded the Distinguished Flying Cross. Paddon retired from service on 10 November 1950.

== Family life ==
Paddon married Sheila Mary Mansell in 1935, but she died in Malta on 23 September 1939. They had two daughters.

He married again in 1948 to Anita Williams; they had three daughters both born in Rhodesia.

He later married Kay Paddon.

He died in retirement in Rhodesia in 1967.
