= Spangenberg Castle (Hesse) =

- Schloss Spangenberg or Burg Spangenberg
- Spangenberg
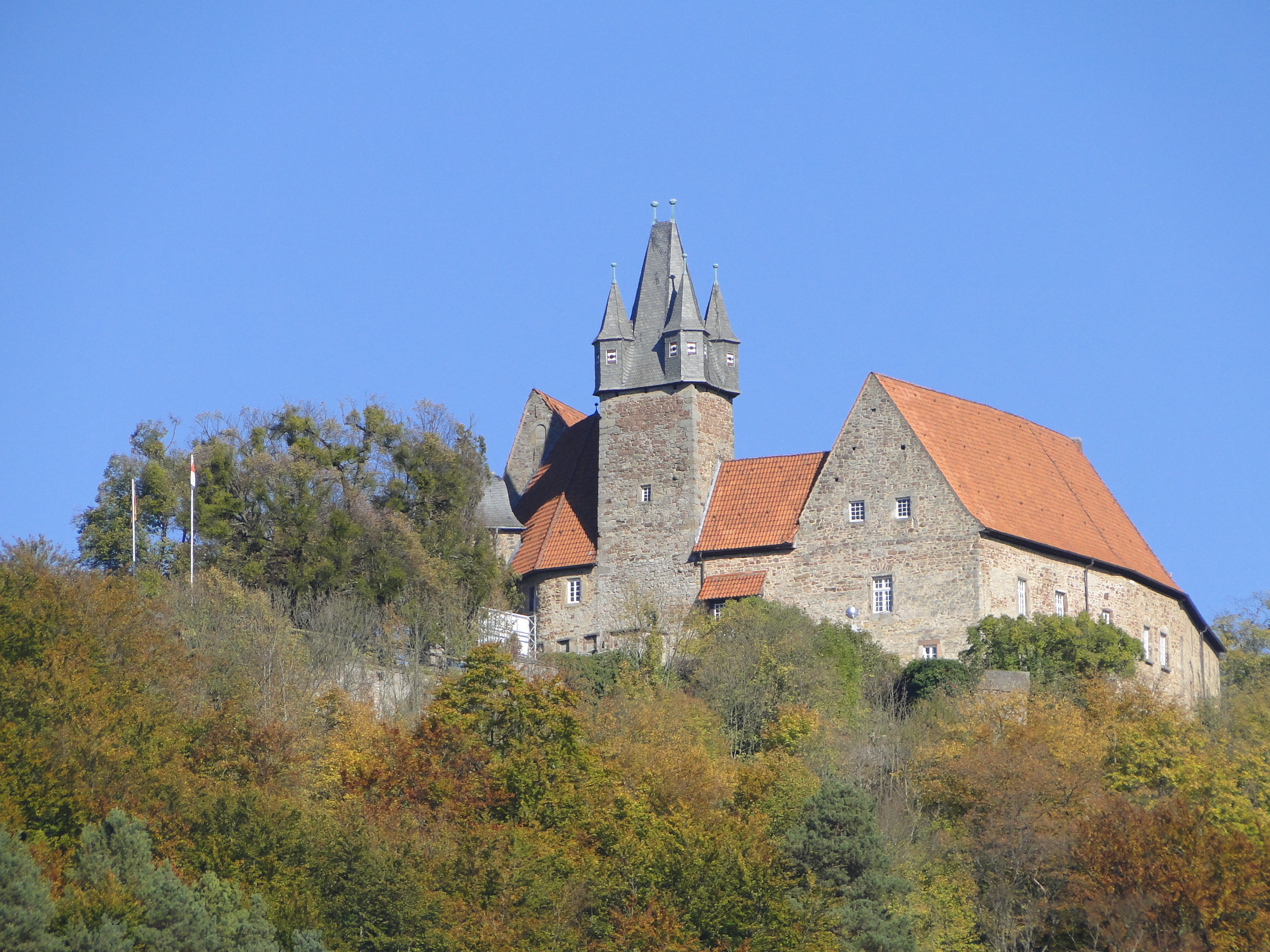
- Spangenberg Castle

Site information
- Type: hill castle
- Code: DE-HE

Location
- Location within Hesse Location within Germany
- Coordinates: 51°7′10″N 9°39′43.3″E
- Height: Height missing, see template documentation

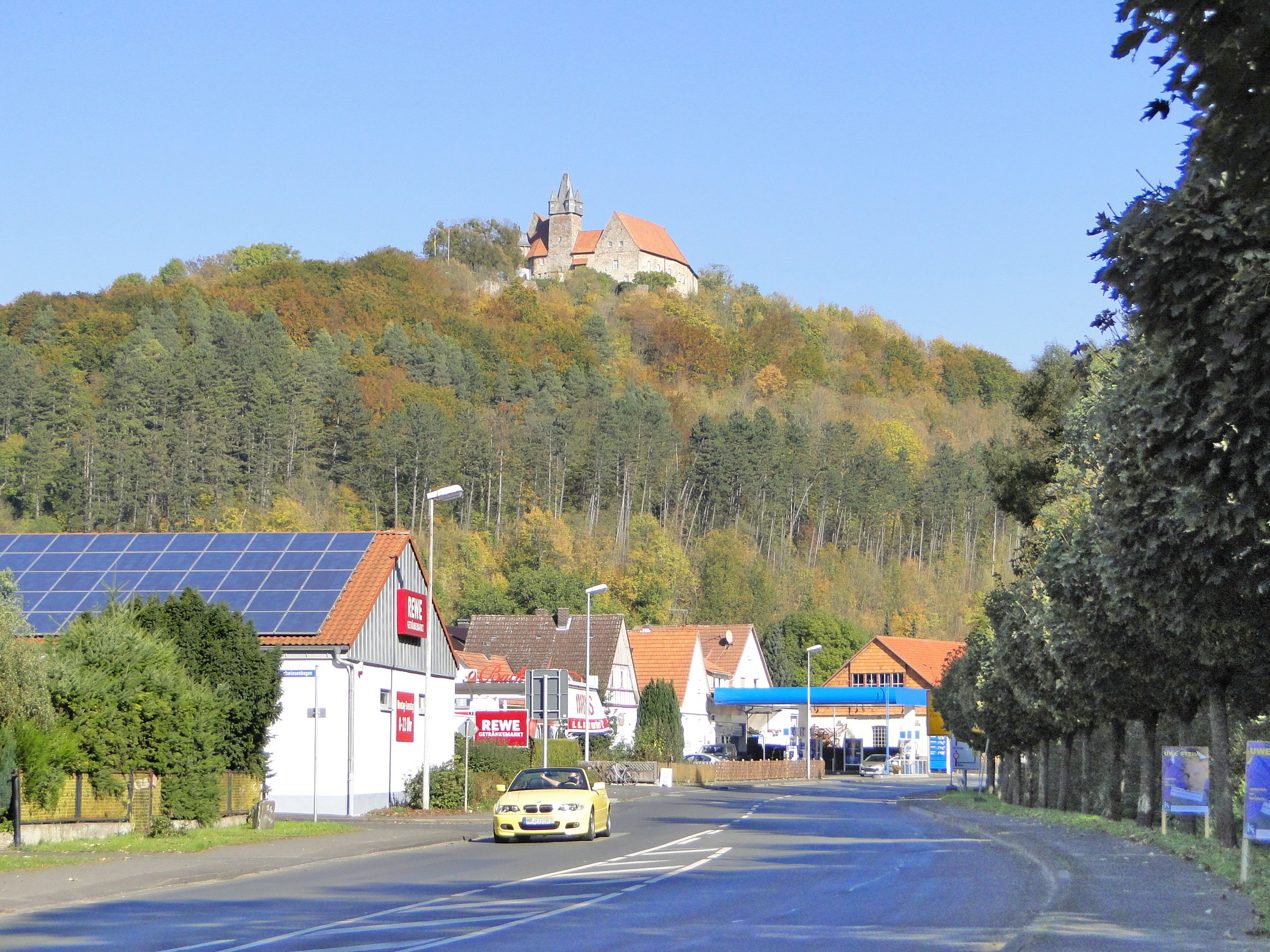
View of the castle from Melsunger Straße in Spangenberg

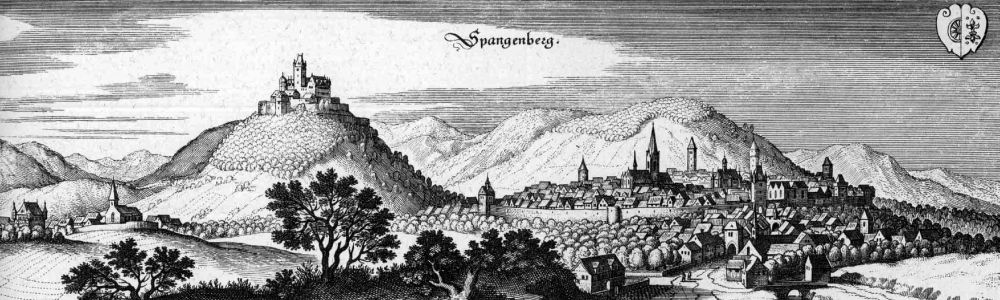
Spangenberg Castle in an extract of the Topographia Hassiae et Regionum Vicinarum (1655)

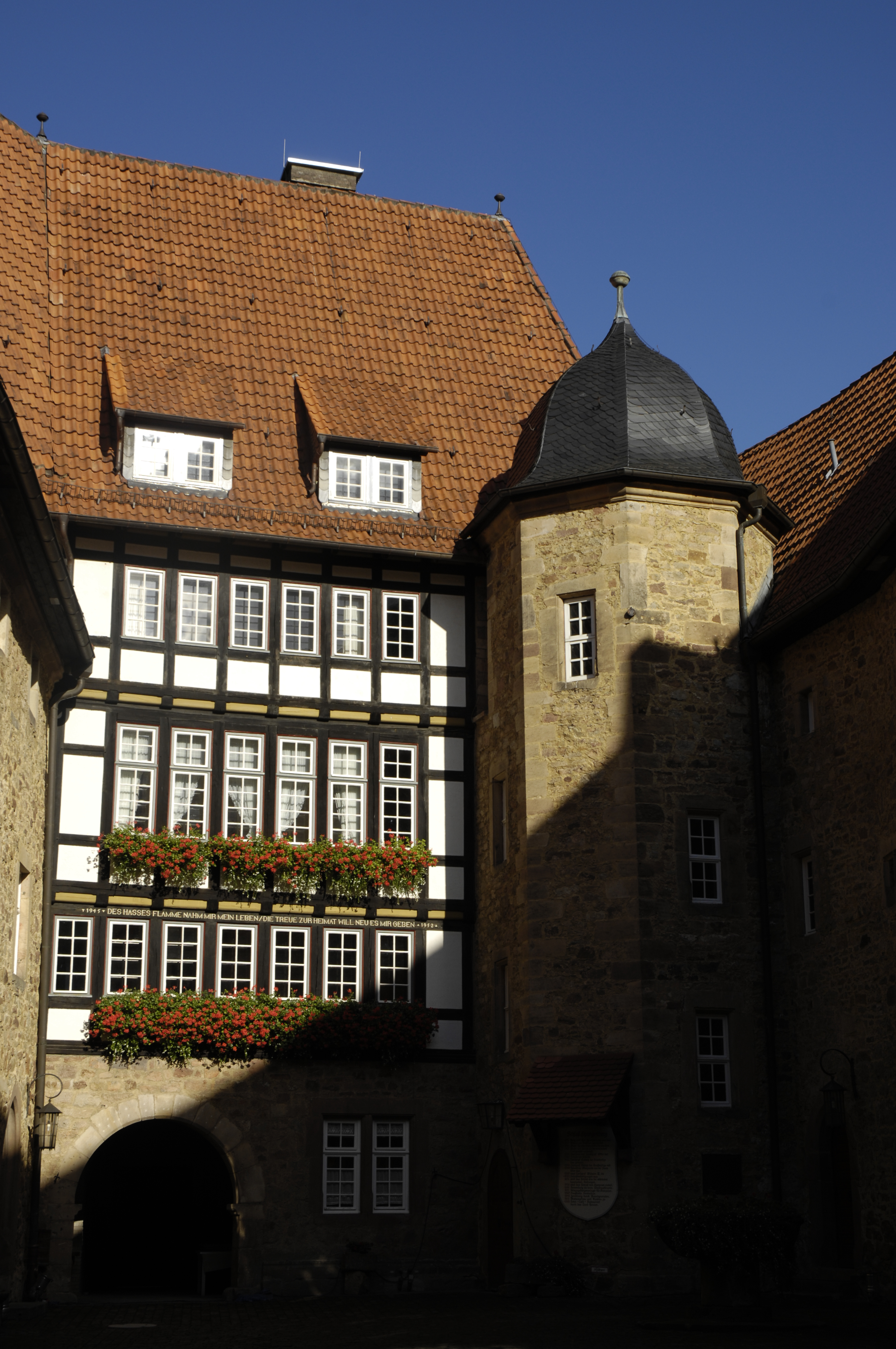
The inner courtyard of the castle

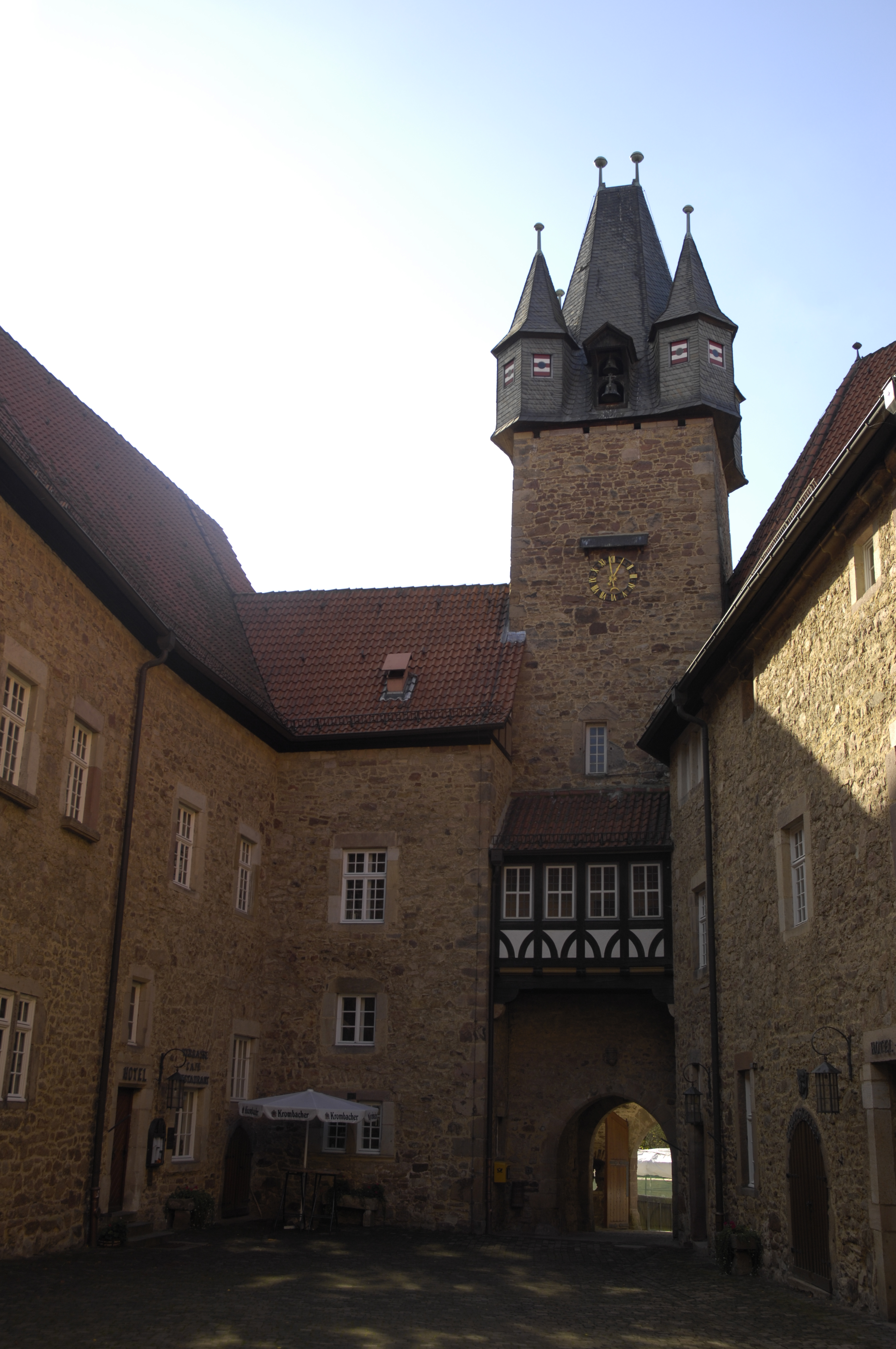
The tower above the gateway to the inner courtyard

Spangenberg Castle (German: Schloss Spangenberg) is a schloss above the small German town of Spangenberg in the North Hesse county of Schwalm-Eder-Kreis. The originally Gothic building was first a medieval fortified castle, then a fortress, hunting lodge, prison, forestry school and is now a hotel and restaurant.

== Location ==
Spangenberg Castle is located on the wooded hill of Schloßberg, between the town of Spangenberg in the Pfieffe valley to the east and south, and the village of Elbersdorf on the Pfieffe tributary of Essebach to the west and north.

== History ==
The first castle on the site was probably built by the lords of Treffurt, who came from Thuringia, as the centre of their small barony in the region around Spangenberg and Morschen. From here, it could guard the important trading route "through long Hesse" from Frankfurt to Leipzig. This road was an important factor in the development of the newly founded settlement below the castle, which was already being referred to as a town (civitas) in 1261. However it was not until 1309 that it was granted town rights by the knights, Hermann and Frederick of Treffurt, in accordance with the Lippstadt town rights act. The size and shape of the 13th-century hilltop castle are not exactly known. In the southern part of the site, parts of the original palas have survived. This housed the social and residential quarters for the family of the castle lord. Access to the castle was probably especially well protected from the outset and the entire site was surrounded by a wall. It is likely that most of the outbuildings were initially constructed in the half-timbered style. Since a supply of drinking water was essential, the well, about 100 metres deep, would have been sunk during the construction of the castle.

== Knightly castle and Landgravial schloss ==
The first recorded owner of the castle and town of Spangenberg was Lord Hermann of Treffurt in 1235. He was enfeoffed with the Barony of Spangenberg by the Count of Ziegenhain. Since that time the lords of Treffurt were also called the lords of Spangenberg. The brothers, Hermann and Frederick of Spangenberg and Treffurt became robber barons, causing unrest in 1327 in the surrounding Thuringian countryside. In the time that followed a marked decline in the fortunes of the lords of Treffurt and Spangenberg may be seen from the records. At times they led a dissolute life, made enemies of their neighbours as a result of their violent behaviour and even fought amongst one another. Finally Lord Hermann IX sold the castle, title and estate of Spangenberg in 1350 to the Hessian landgrave, Hesse II for 8,000 silver marks, a hefty sum at that time even for a territorial prince. Since that time, Spangenberg has been Hessian.

The castle was now used for over two centuries by the Hessian landgraves as a residenz and hunting lodge:

- Family seat of Landgrave Henry the Iron (1299–1377).
- Otto "der Schütz", son of Henry II, lived here and supplied material for many anecdotes and legends (1322–1366); Otto cultivated the "noble art of hunting with hounds and horse, hunting horn, crossbow and boar spear"; his love story with Elspeth of Cleves was described by Gottfried Kinkel in the epic poem Otto der Schütz. Eine rheinische Geschichte in zwölf Abenteuern (Cotta’sche Handbibliothek; Vol. 171, Cotta, Stuttgart, 1846).
- Landgrave Hermann the Learned (1344–1413) resided at the castle.
- Landgrave Louis the Peaceful (1402–1458) was born at Spangenberg Castle and also died there.
- Landgrave William I (1466–1515) died at Spangenberg Castle.
- Landgrave Philip the Magnanimous (1504–1567) led Hesse to a position of political and cultural importance. His mistress, Margarethe von der Saale, lived in the corner house on Burgstraße and Klosterstraße in the town of Spangenberg.
- Landgrave William the Wise (1532–1592) strengthened the fortress considerably and gave the schloss its present external appearance.
- In addition, the castle was the dower house for several Hessian landgravines over this period.

Architecturally these years were of great significance for the entire site. Landgrave Louis the Peaceful in particular had the castle fortifications reinforced through the construction of the outer walls with six demi-bastions (Schalentürmen). A new gateway with the state coat of arms and three decorative battlements gave the entrance an imposing appearance. The castle was considered to be so safe that, in the 15th century, large quantities of money and archives belonging to the landgrave were kept and guarded here.

=== Fortress, prison, forestry school ===
The advent of firearms made extensive new construction measures necessary. The mighty earth rampart with its casemates on the main attack axis on the northeastern side was probably built under Landgrave Philip. A large battery tower, 22 metres in diameter, formed the corner point of this new fortification. The system of underground passages laid out at this time to serve the defence of the new fortress works has largely survived to this day, but is not however open to the public.

In 1584 Landgrave William IV appointed Hans Wilhelm Kirchhof as the burgrave of Spangenberg Castle. His second marriage was to Margarethe Stuckenrad and they had nine children. In addition to his work as the burgrave, he also wrote about the castle. From 1584 to 1605 he wrote his Wendunmuhth, a collection of farces, anecdotes and stories. He died at the age of around 80 in 1602 or 1603.

Around 1580 Landgrave William IV had a hall built together with its attached "commandant's quarters" (Kommandantenbau) on the northeast side. The court was thus completely remodelled. At the start of the Thirty Years' War the fortifications had to be strengthen again. In 1636 a bastion system was built on the west side. To replace the outbuildings that were demolished to make way for this the building that, today, house the hunting museum, was built on the rampart. Because the fortifications had been strengthened, the castle remained in Hessian hands in the Thirty Years' War during the reign of Landgravine Amalie Elisabeth (1637–1650). The town, by contrast, was half-destroyed in 1637. After 1648, the castle largely lost its importance as a landgrave seat and fortress and only maintenance work was carried out on it. Nevertheless, Spangenberg was still a secondary fortress of the state of Hesse-Cassel. The old castle was no longer valued in the Baroque era as a royal residence, but was still maintained as a fortress and used to accommodate invalids (war wounded).

During the Seven Years' War (1756–1763), the fortress, which was only manned by invalids, was captured by the French for the first time in a surprise attack in 1758. The French captured 18 cannon, 307 firearms, ammunition and 44 kegs of powder. From 1763 the fortress was used as a state prison (for the internment of officers). To that end, several large rooms were divided into cells. In 1840 a new guardroom was built outside the moat. During the constitutional struggles in the Electorate of Hesse at the time of electors William II (1821–1847) and Frederick William I (1847–1866), a large number of political prisoners were detained at Spangenberg.

Following the annexation of Electoral Hesse by Prussia in 1866, the prison was closed and only the most urgent repairs were carried out. The empty buildings were managed by a castellan. The fortifications began to become overgrown. During the Franco-Prussian War (1870–1871), French prisoners were incarcerated there.

It was not until 1907–1908 that a new use was found for the castle when it became a Prussian school of forestry. Although this entailed major reconstruction work, an effort was made to preserve the original character of the building. The advent of the forestry school recalled the old tradition of Otto the hunter and its former importance as a hunting lodge. On 15 June 1913, Kaiser Wilhelm II visited the forestry school in Spangenberg. In its 32 years, around 1,200 young forest officers qualified for their profession at Spangenberg Castle. In 1932, the counts of Giech sold the castle into private ownership.

=== Destruction and rebuilding – hotel and restaurant ===
In the Second World War the castle was used again as a prisoner-of-war camp (Oflag IX-A/H), this time for British officers. Shortly after their departure at the end of March 1945, the building was completely razed to the ground by an American air raid. Only the ruined curtain walls survived.

The commitment of Spangenberg's townsfolk to the castle finally led to its reconstruction by the State of Hesse in the 1950s under the direction of the Commissioner of Town Planning, Dr. Textor. Although the interior of the palace had been completely destroyed in the war, the outer shape of the building hints at the importance of the fortress had in earlier times. The access is guarded by strong bastions. The main castle is protected by a deep, wide moat. The narrow courtyard is accessed over two approaches. The western gate, which was originally protected by a drawbridge, is dominated by a tall tower with a steep, hipped roof. Before the fire, the castle roof had a variety of dormers and roof ornaments which were abandoned in the reconstruction. The simple multi-storey building of the 15th to 17th centuries had small two-piece gothic windows upstairs and facing the courtyard; otherwise it had high rectangular windows dating to the 17th century. Inside, none of the great wall paintings survived the ravages of war. They showed, inter alia, the return home of Otto the Hunter. In the former audience hall, a putti frieze was to be seen; in addition Gothic fireplaces and grand stoves were located in the other rooms, of which only fragments remain. Of the original 13th-century Treffurt fortress, all that is left is a round-arched vaulted cellar above a once 126-metre-deep well today.

Following the previous use of the castle as a hunting lodge, a royal country residence, a prison and a forestry school was added another role. Today the castle is home to a gourmet hotel and restaurant with conference rooms. A hunting museum is based in the old armoury, which dates to 1625.

In the early 1960s, out of the large number of the state-owned castles and palaces, all those able to be managed as a restaurant and/or hotel were identified. The former managing director of the "Castles and Palaces of Hesse", Johannes Lill, explained the purpose of this measure "You did not want to restore the monuments of the past and then leave them to die in beauty again. Instead, the intention was to fill them with new life, because the monuments are now in our midst again. This is especially true of Spangenberg Castle..."

== Panorama ==
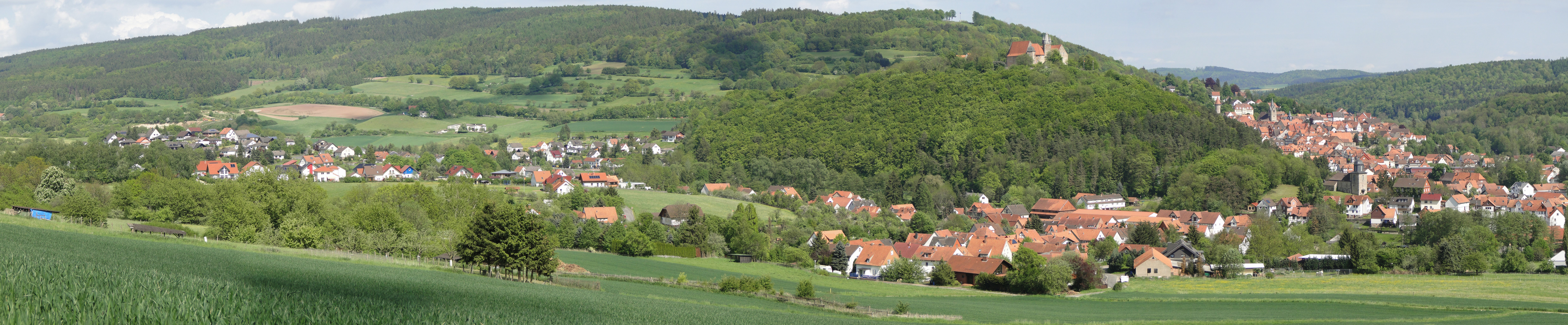
Elbersdorf (left) on the Essebach and Spangenberg itself (right) on the Pfieffe with the castle on the hill of Schloßberg (centre right); on the other side of the Schloßberg, the hill of Bromsberg, with its war memorial, may be seen

== Literature ==
- Rudolf Knappe: Mittelalterliche Burgen in Hessen: 800 Burgen, Burgruinen und Burgstätten. 3rd edn. Wartberg-Verlag, Gudensberg-Gleichen, 2000, ISBN 3-86134-228-6, p. 83.
- Schlösser, Burgen, alte Mauern. Herausgegeben vom Hessendienst der Staatskanzlei, Wiesbaden, 1990, ISBN 3-89214-017-0, p. 336.
