= Essebach =

River in Germany

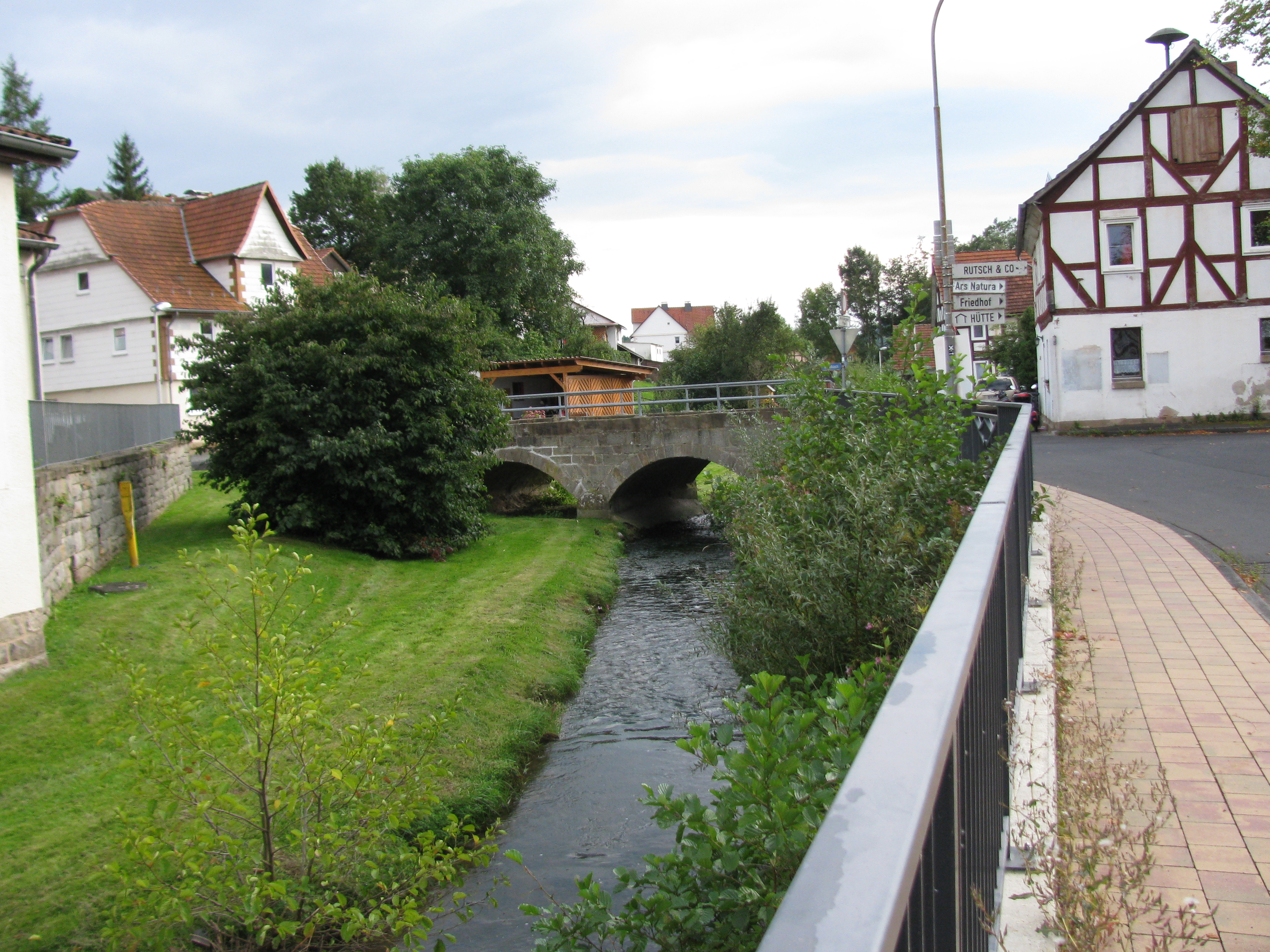

Location
- Country: Germany
- State: Hesse

Physical characteristics
- Mouth
  - location: Pfieffe
  - coordinates: 51.1131°N 9.6496°E
- Length: 11.6 km (7.2 mi)

Basin features
- Progression: Pfieffe→ Fulda→ Weser→ North Sea

Essebach is a river of Hesse, Germany. It flows into the Pfieffe in Spangenberg.

== See also ==
- List of rivers of Hesse
