= Royal Marines Museum =

Museum in Portsmouth, England

Coordinates: 50.785°N 1.054°W

Royal Marines Experience
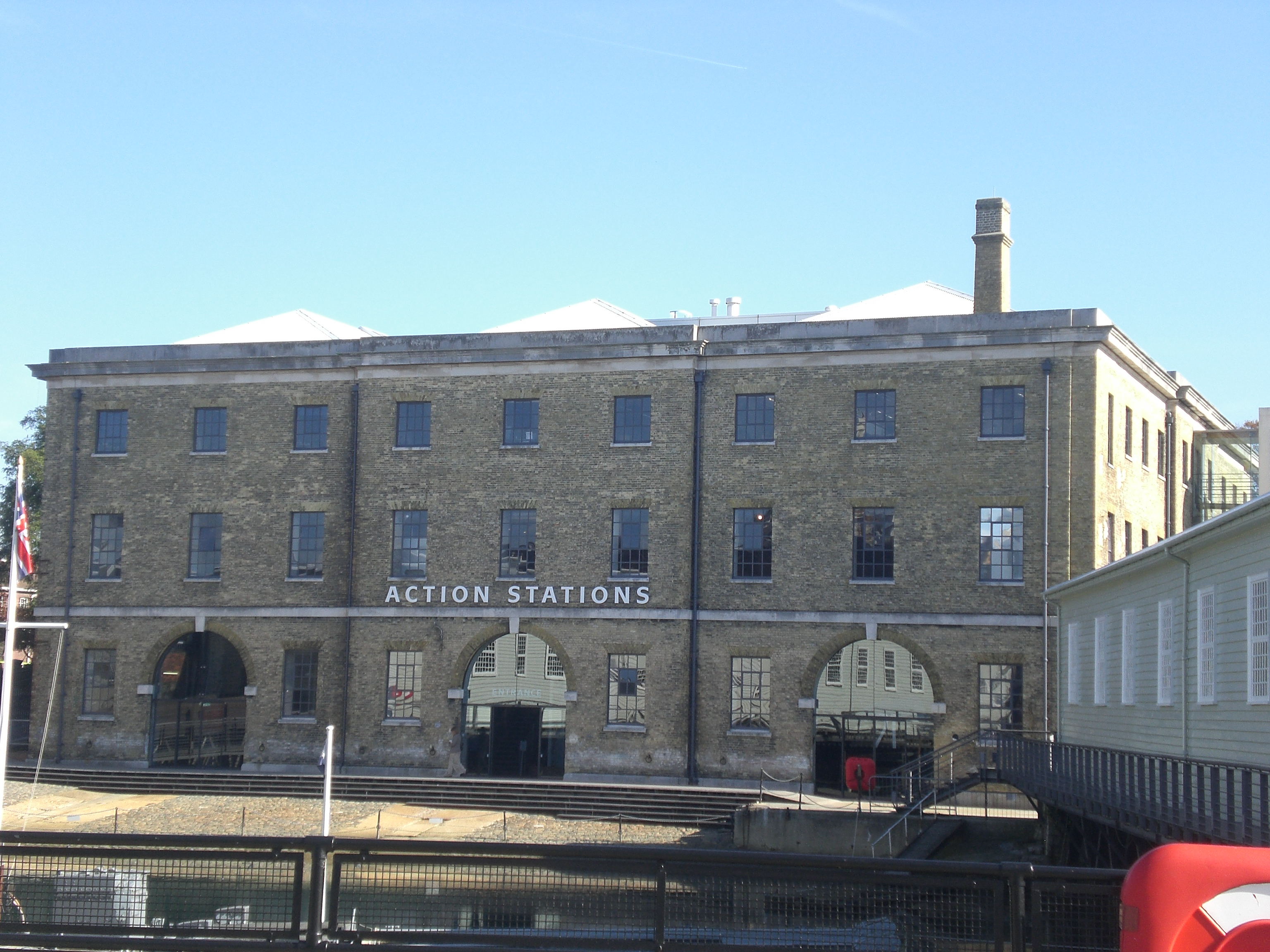
- The Victorian boathouse at Portsmouth Dockyard which opened as the Royal Marines Experience on 24 October 2026.

- Shown in Hampshire
- Established: October 1958
- Location: Portsmouth Dockyard, Hampshire, England
- Website: Royal Marines Experience

The Royal Marines Experience is a museum in Portsmouth Dockyard, Hampshire, England, dedicated to the history of the Royal Marines from their beginnings in 1664 to the present day. From its formation in October 1958 to 2017 it was known as the Royal Marines Museum. In 2011 it formally became part of the National Museum of the Royal Navy, an executive non-departmental public body of the Ministry of Defence.

Its collection was housed from 1972 until 2017 in the former officers' mess at Eastney Barracks, which was originally constructed as the Headquarters of the Royal Marine Artillery in the 1860s. That collection includes a large number of medals, of which over 8,000 were on display at the Medal Room in Eastney Barracks, including all ten Victoria Crosses awarded to the Corps – those ten remain on display in the new Experience.

== History ==
=== 2008–2016 ===
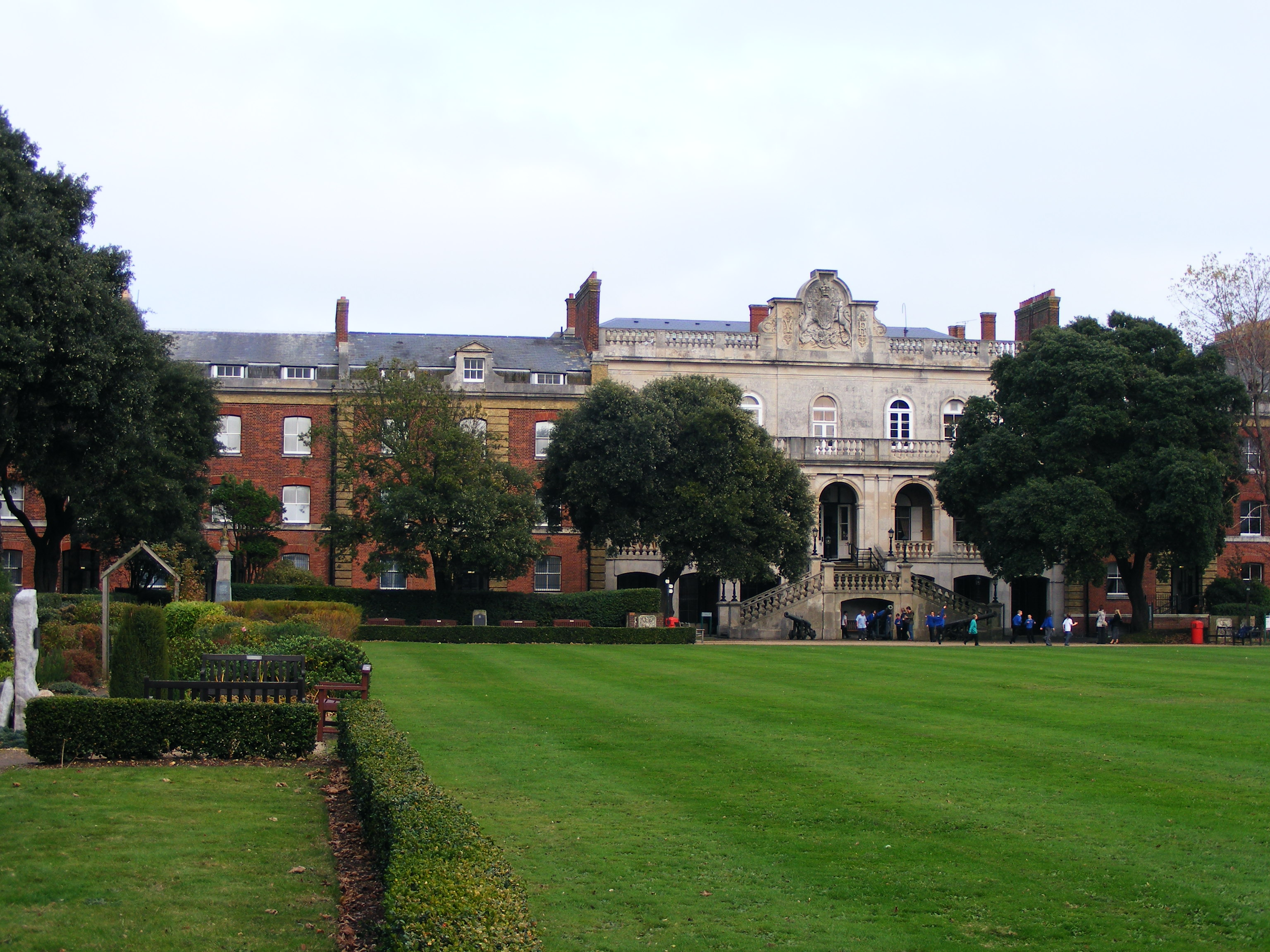
Eastney Barracks, home of the Royal Marines Museum from 1958 to 2017

In September 2008, the Museum successfully purchased a rare medal for £41,000 (thanks to a contribution of £28,000 from the National Heritage Memorial Fund); the Naval General Service Medal with Trafalgar clasp was awarded to Lt Lewis Buckle Reeve, who, following serious injury at the Battle of Trafalgar, was laid next to the mortally wounded Nelson on board HMS Victory. This medal was displayed at Eastney Barracks alongside Lt Reeve's entry in the Royal Marines Muster List for HMS Victory at Trafalgar.

On 28 October 2008 – its 50th birthday – the Museum won the Best Small Visitor Attraction of the Year award from Tourism South East, recognising its excellence, both in terms of exhibitions and the quality of the customer service provided.

March 2009 saw the launch of the Beverley Gallery – an area dedicated to a rolling programme of Special Exhibitions highlighting a broad range of subjects to a variety of audiences. The first exhibition was entitled Return to Helmand: The Royal Marines in Afghanistan and opened by the Commandant General Royal Marines, Major General Garry Robison. The second – ran from April to October 2010 – was entitled Griff – Thinker, Painter, Forger, Spy? and celebrated the memorable life of Captain Guy Griffiths, a Royal Marine pilot. The final Special Exhibition was called Commando Mind and celebrated the strength of mind used by Royal Marines to achieve extraordinary results in the face of, often difficult, challenges – physical, mental or environmental.

=== 2017–present ===
Following a decision made by the Director of the National Museum of the Royal Navy, John Rawlinson, the Museum's galleries at Eastney Barracks closed on 1 April 2017, although its rooms there continued to function as curatorial offices and a hospitality venue until the end of 2018.

A temporary display entitled 'The Making of the Royal Marines Commando', highlighting the demands of the 32-week training course undertaken by all Royal Marines recruits, was established at the Action Stations area of the Historic Dockyard at Portsmouth. As part of the Seamore Project, the Royal Marines Museum was due to open a new permanent exhibition in a Victorian Boathouse building on the Portsmouth Dockyard site in 2020.

However, after failing to obtain a grant from the Heritage Lottery Fund the National Museum of the Royal Navy announced that the opening of a new museum would be delayed 'probably for at least two years'. The new museum was financed by a lottery grant of £4.6m, with the balance of the £14m coming from other fundraising. The new museum eventually opened on 24 October 2026.

== See also ==
- Royal Marines Volunteer Cadet Corps

== Publications ==
- Wilkins, Keith, Col, Leading the Way: The History of the Royal Marines Museum, (Royal Marines Museum, 2008)
