= Guy Griffiths =

- Born: 6 June 1915; Pembroke Dock, Wales
- Died: 12 July 1999 (aged 84); Chichester, England
- Military career
- Allegiance: United Kingdom
- Branch: Royal Marines
- Service years: 1938–1953
- Rank: Captain
- Nickname: Griff
- Conflicts: Second World War; Korean War

Guy Beresford Kerr "Griff" Griffiths (6 June 1915 – 12 July 1999) was a Royal Marine pilot. He served as a pilot during the Second World War and gained notoriety as a prisoner of war for using his artistic skills to forge documents and provide misinformation by feeding Nazi intelligence with fake sketches of British aircraft. After the war he continued to fly various types of aircraft as a test pilot and has the distinction of being the first Royal Marines officer to fly a helicopter.

== Early life ==
Griffiths was born in 1915 at Pembroke Dock where his father was a senior Admiralty civil servant.

== Career ==
Commissioned in the Royal Marines on 1 September 1934, 'Griff' was on HMS Resolution off the coast of Spain during the Spanish Civil War. In 1938 his elder brother was killed in the Indian Army. He took up flying in January that year and was eventually assigned to 803 Naval Air Squadron flying Blackburn Skua dive-bombers aboard HMS Ark Royal.

=== Second World War ===
Eleven days into the Second World War, HMS Ark Royal picked up an SOS from the merchant ship SS Fanad Head, under attack from German submarine U30. Three Skuas, including one piloted by Griffiths, conducted the first British Naval bombing of the war. Due to the incorrect fuse arming in relation to the height of attack, the bomb explosions of Griff's aircraft and that of Lieutenant Thurstan RN damaged the tails of both planes, and they crashed into the sea with the loss of each air observer. Griff and Thurstan were the first naval officers captured in the war.

At the time of their capture, the prisoner of war camp infrastructure was only just developing; those in captivity found their conditions relatively relaxed. Griff was placed in a number of POW camps – including Spangenburg Castle (Oflag IX-A/H) and Dulag luft – before incarceration in Stalag Luft III.

Stalag Luft III achieved worldwide notoriety thanks to The Great Escape released in 1963. During Griff's time in captivity there, he put his considerable artistic skills to good use. He was a forger, producing fake documents as required, and he also produced detailed paintings of aeroplanes based on aspects of those in current production, to provide misinformation to the enemy in order to buy time.

Griff was also in contact with MI9 (British Military Intelligence Section 9) – his letters to the Globe & Laurel (the Royal Marines Corps' publication) contained encrypted details for MI9 of identities of personnel in the camp.

Griff spent the remainder of the war in Stalag Luft III. In 1945 he led the captives of his camp out to the Americans after being mistaken by Germans as being a Hungarian officer.

=== Post-war ===
Following the war, Griff underwent significant re-training to fly the latest aircraft. Once flying again, he served aboard HMS Glory. During the Korean War, he was instrumental in providing the first visual confirmation of a downed MiG 15 jet, which led to the first capture of this type by the west.

In later years, from 1953 to 1958, Griff became the Editor of the Globe & Laurel publication. He also ran the Bolero coffee shop in Chichester (West Sussex, England). Between 1969 and 1980, he was domestic superintendent for the Royal West Sussex Hospital, and subsequently the whole Chichester district. Griff died from a heart attack on 12 July 1999 aged 84. The complete collection of watercolours and drawings he completed during his service career were subsequently bequeathed to the Royal Marines Museum.

== Publications ==
- Reece, Michael, 2012. Flying Royal Marines, Royal Marines Historical Society, Special Publication number 38
