= Brian Duncan Shaw =

English chemistry university lecturer and army officer

Brian Duncan Shaw MM TD
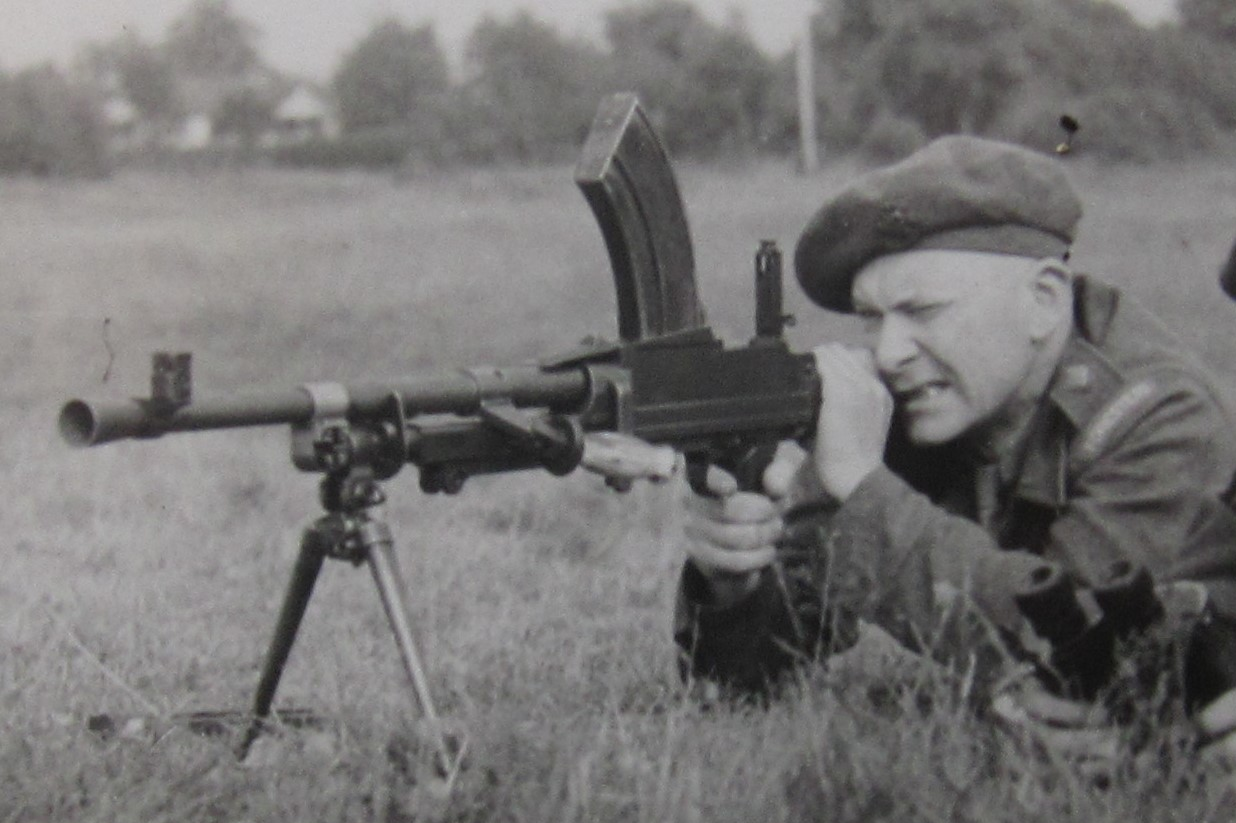
- Brian Shaw in 1947
- Born: 10 February 1898; Ilkeston, Derbyshire, England
- Died: 7 November 1999 (aged 101); Beeston, Nottinghamshire, England
- Education: University College, Nottingham
- Spouses: Margaret Elsie Wheldon (m. 1916) Alice Maud (m. 1990)
- Awards: Military Medal; Territorial Decoration
- Scientific career
- Thesis: (1927)
- Doctoral advisor: Frederic Stanley Kipping

Lieutenant Colonel Brian Duncan Shaw, MM, TD (10 February 1898 – 7 November 1999) was a British chemistry lecturer at the University of Nottingham, known for his demonstrations on explosives.

== Early and personal life ==
Shaw was born in Ilkeston, Derbyshire, the fourth and youngest child of Samuel Shaw and Lydia Emma Shaw, his brothers and sisters being named Lydia Emma, Mabel and Clarence Gordon. His father was a brick manufacturer and his mother had been working as a teacher.

He started working at Boots the Chemist in 1914 as an apprentice pharmacist.

In May 1916, he married his first wife, Margaret Elsie Wheldon. After her death in 1990 he married Alice Maud on 5 June of the same year; she died in 1998, a year before Shaw himself.

== Career ==
=== Military service ===
During the First World War, with the Royal Lincolnshire Regiment, he fought on the battles of Somme, Cambrai and Passchendaele. In July 1917 Cpl Shaw was awarded the Military Medal (MM) for bravery at Beaucamp near Cambrai.

He served with the 5th Battalion, Sherwood Foresters in the Second World War. At the Fall of France, on 10 June 1940, he was cut off in Normandy by German tanks, and was separated from the battalion he was with. After that, he got a bike and spent ten weeks hiding from the Nazis, while trying to reach Spain, eventually cycling 300 miles (480 kilometres). Near Poitiers, a French gendarme stopped him because the bicycle lacked a plaque used for annual tax, and phoned the Germans, who made him prisoner. He was sent to Germany and spent the rest of the war in five POW camps, including at Tittmoning, Bavaria and Spangenburg bei Kassel.

As a prisoner of war, Shaw took part in theatrical productions. Among other things he played the part of the ghost in Hamlet in a production at Tittmoning.

=== Academic career ===
Apart from a brief period as a Lecturer at the East London College, ending in 1923, Shaw spent his entire career as a lecturer in chemistry at University College in Nottingham, which from 1948 onwards was the University of Nottingham.

From 1930, he became known for the "Explosives Lecture" which demonstrated a large variety of ways to produce flashes and bangs using chemistry, including the barking dog reaction. He would continue to provide this lecture for a total of 60 years, extending long past his official retirement. In 1969, the Explosives Lecture was filmed by the BBC.

He published several articles on pyridines, mainly in the Journal of the Chemical Society.

After his retirement in 1965, he continued giving lectures and worked as an expert witness in several court cases, such as the defence of the Angry Brigade.

A blue plaque was installed on 16 November 2012 at his home. As a part of the Periodic table of videos, Prof. Martyn Poliakoff and Brady Haran filmed the event.

== The Shaw Medal ==
In 1988, the University of Nottingham created a medal in his honour called the Shaw Medal. Shaw himself was the first recipient of this prize.

== Gallery ==
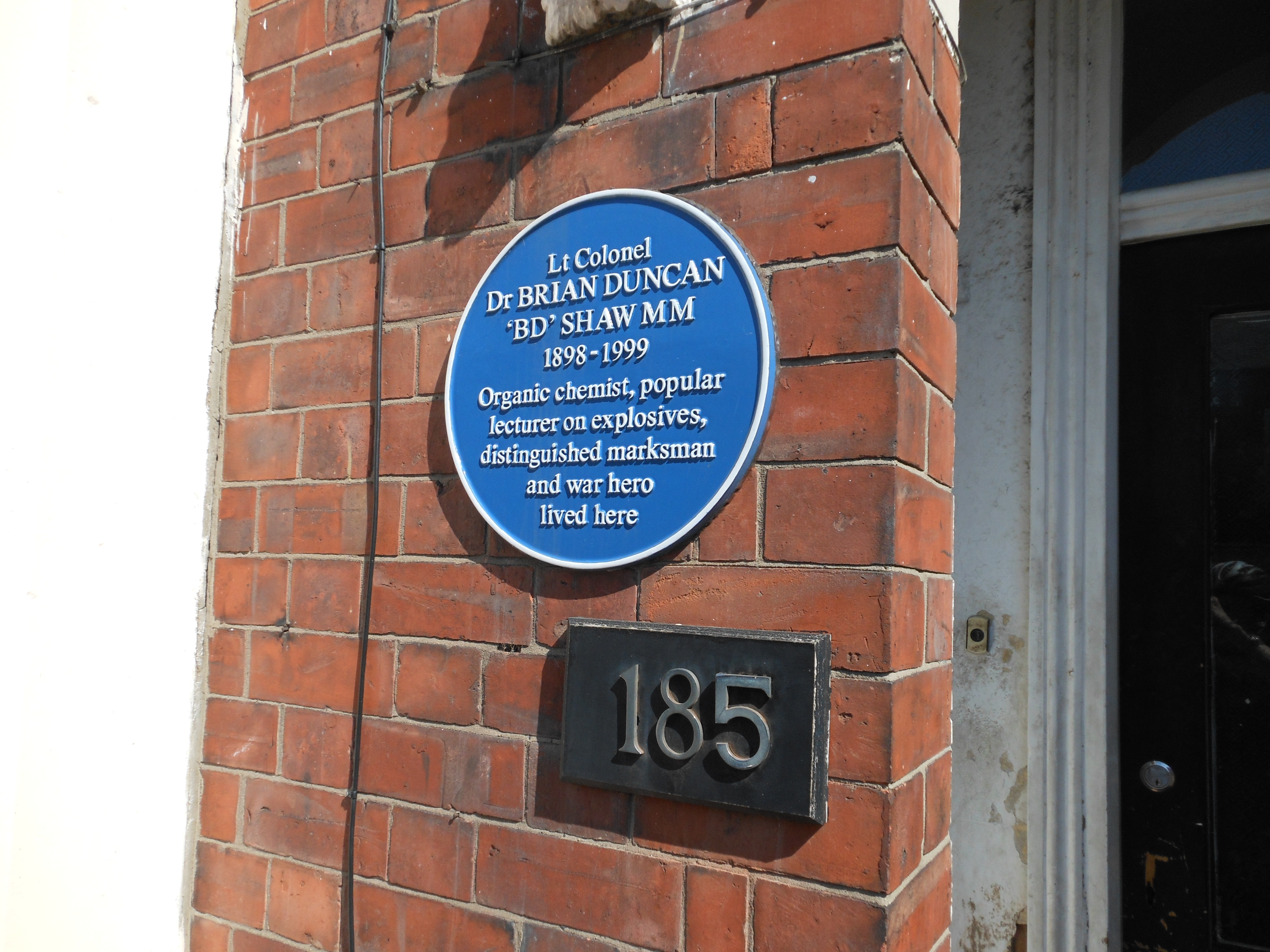
The blue plaque located at the front door of its former residence at Queens Road, Beeston.

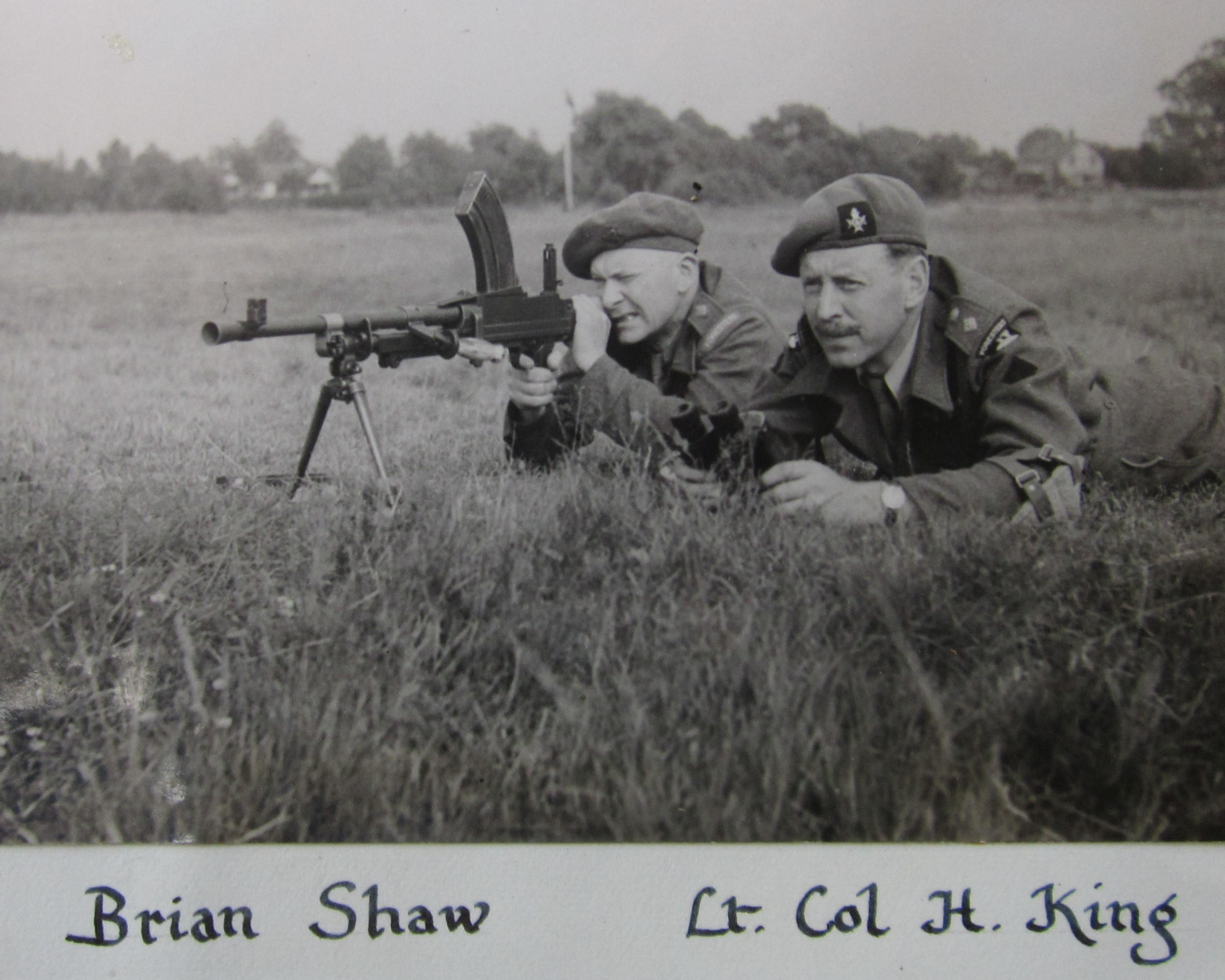
Shaw (left), 5th Battalion Sherwood Foresters at Bisley 1947, firing a Bren light machine gun. The 5th Battalion team won the 'China Cup', 'Velongdis Cup' and 'Lewis 9mm' cup at Bisley in 1947

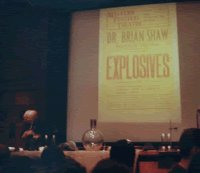
Rare image of Dr Brian Duncan Shaw giving a practical demonstration of explosive chemistry at the age of 88.
