= Stalag XX-A =

German World War II prisoner-of-war camp

- Toruń, German-occupied Poland
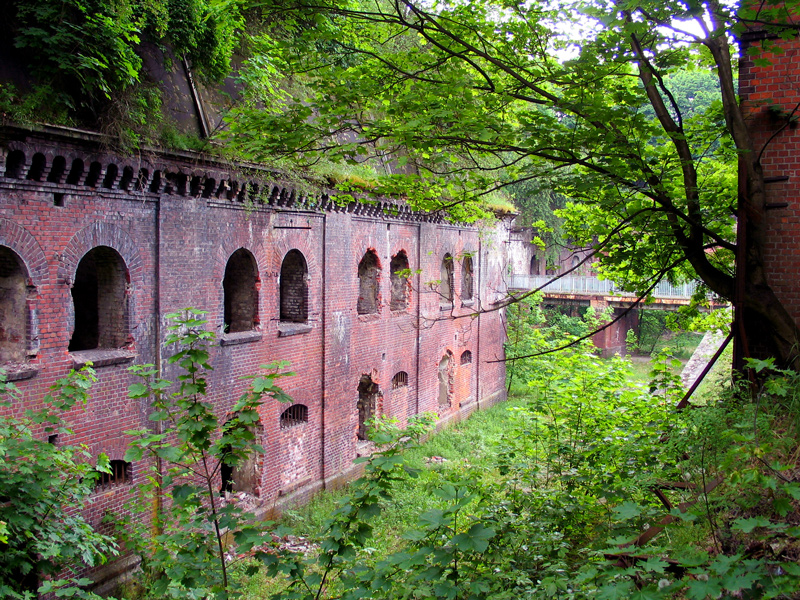
- Fort XI of the Toruń Fortress, one of the forts occupied by Stalag XX-A

Site information
- Type: Prisoner-of-war camp
- Controlled by: Nazi Germany

Location
- Torun, Poland
- Location within Poland
- Coordinates: 53.01°N 18.59°E

Site history
- In use: 1939–1945
- Battles/wars: World War II

Garrison information
- Occupants: Polish, British, French, Australian and Soviet prisoners of war

Stalag XX-A was a German World War II prisoner-of-war camp located in Toruń in German-occupied Poland. It was not a single camp and contained as many as 20,000 men at its peak. The main camp was located in seven forts of the 19th-century Toruń Fortress, located in the southern part of the city.

== History ==
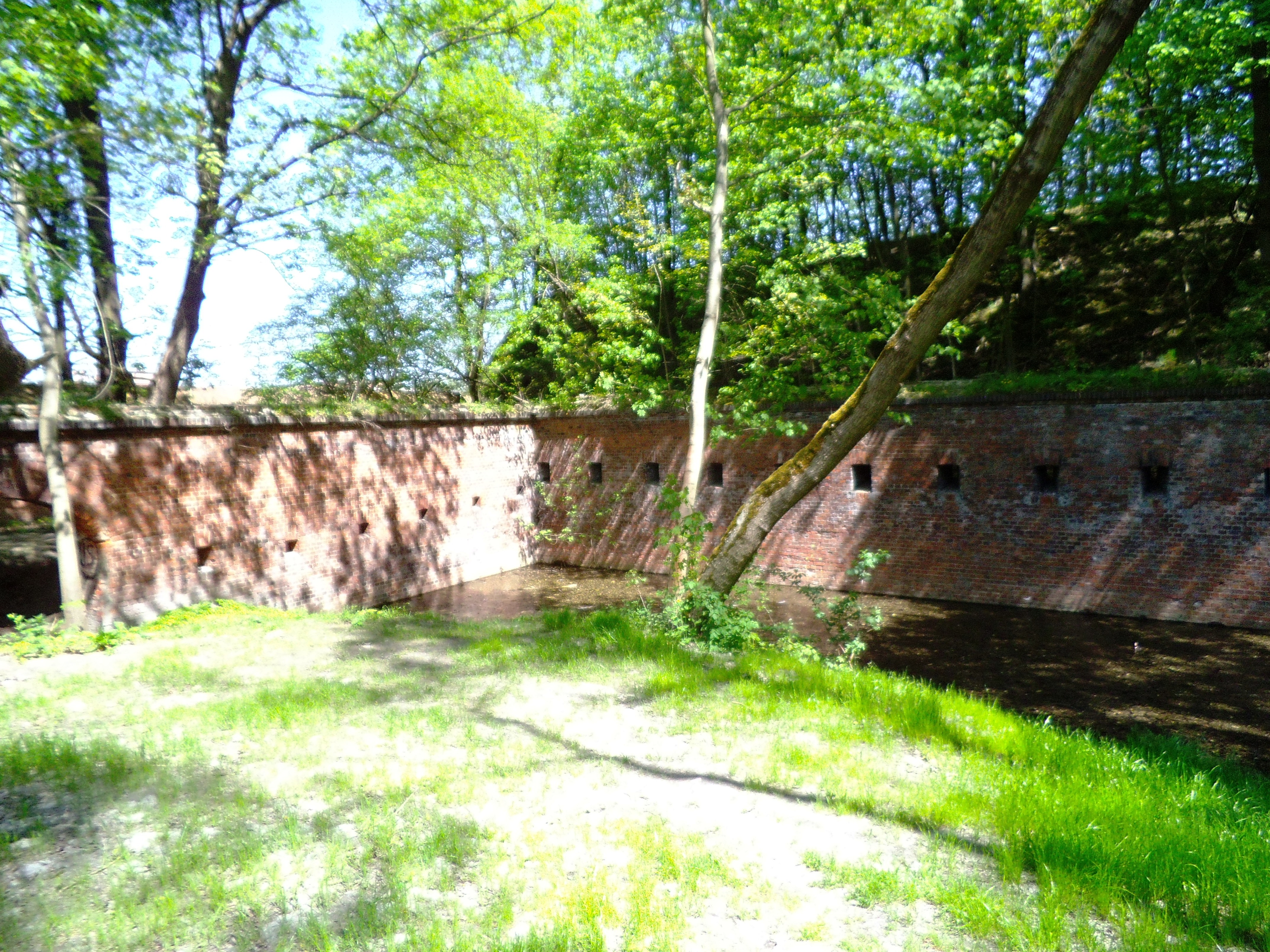
Fort XVII, one of the forts occupied by Stalag XX-A

In September 1939 some of the forts were used as POW camps for Polish prisoners, specifically those captured after the surrender of the Polish fort at Westerplatte at the mouth of the river Vistula and on the Hel Peninsula. In June 1940 additional forts were added to the camp to accommodate British soldiers. The first to arrive were 403 men from the Allied campaign in Norway. Later, about 4,500 arrived from Dunkirk and subsequently from the British 51st (Highland) Infantry Division captured at Saint-Valery-en-Caux. In 1941 and 1942 Soviet prisoners arrived. At the peak there were about 10,000 prisoners at the camp. However, many of them were located in sub-camps. The camp was expanded by building additional wooden barracks.

The POWs in the camp were often weakened, exhausted, and various diseases were prevalent, including dysentery, diphtheria, tuberculosis, peptic ulcer disease, etc. Many suffered from depression and had mental breakdowns, and there was a case of suicide. Australian prisoner of war Walter Edward Smith recalled random extrajudicial executions of Polish prisoners of war carried out by the Germans (see German atrocities committed against Polish prisoners of war). Many POWs died in the camp. A hospital was located in Fort XIV, which was operated by the British Sanitary Corps.

The Polish resistance movement facilitated escapes of British POWs from the camp, subsequently sheltering them in Bydgoszcz, and transporting them through Gdynia to neutral Sweden.

The camp was liberated on 1 February 1945 by the Soviet Army.

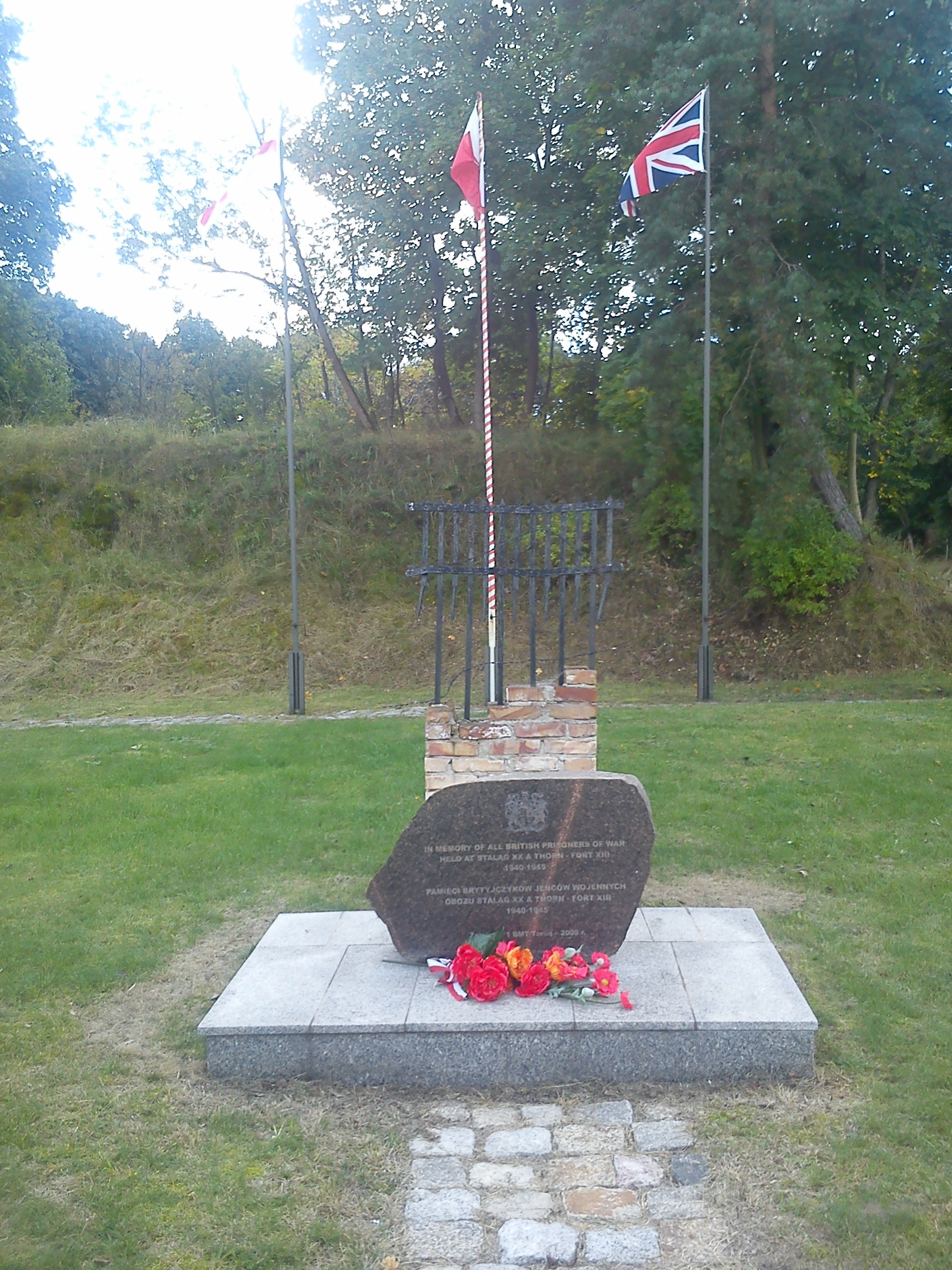
Memorial to British POWs of Stalag XX-A

== Sub-camps ==
In accordance with the Third Geneva Convention, POWs below the rank of Sergeant were required to work and were attached to Arbeitskommando ("labour units") mostly located in various towns and villages in the region. They were hired out to military and civilian contractors. In the case of farm work, this was often carried out on state farms. Sergeants and above could not be forced to work and if they did so were sent to non-working camps. Some of these sub-camps were not the traditional POW camps with barbed wire and guard towers but merely accommodation centres. According to the International Red Cross and British POW Sam Kydd living conditions in the sub-camps were much better than in the main camp. The POWs received better food there, and they had contact with people from the outside, despite the fact that such contacts were forbidden. Some camps were large and created for a particular project.

- Camp 34 - Construction of a large housing project for German colonists.
- Elbing camp
- Konitz camp
- Bromberg Dynamit Nobel AG Factory in Bydgoszcz

Historical Note:

British actor Sam Kydd was a prisoner in one of these camps throughout the war. During his internment, where he remained for the next five years, he took command of the camp's theatrical activities - devising and staging plays. He felt so strongly about his work there that, when he was offered repatriation after three years, he turned it down to continue with his theatrical work. While imprisoned in a sub-camp in Wyrzysk, Sam Kydd had contact with local Poles and learned various phrases in Polish.

== Notable prisoners ==
- Aonghas Caimbeul, Private in 51st (Highland) Division from the Isle of Lewis. He subsequently became a highly important figure in 20th century Scottish Gaelic literature as both a war poet and award-winning memoirist.
- Peter Conder, British soldier, ornithologist and conservationist
- Okey Geffin, South African soldier and rugby union player
- Sam Kydd, British soldier and post-war actor
- Tommy Macpherson, British officer, escapee from the camp
- Frank McLardy, British soldier and Nazi collaborator
- Bruno Malaguti, Italian general
- Airey Neave, British soldier, lawyer and Member of Parliament
- Justin O'Brien, Australian painter
- Brian Paddon, Royal Air Force pilot, escapee from the camp
- Walter Edward Smith, Australian soldier, who escaped from the camp, joined the Polish resistance and took part in the Warsaw Uprising
