= Spangenberg =

- Town
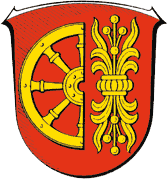
- Coat of arms

- Location of Spangenberg within Schwalm-Eder-Kreis district
- Interactive map of Spangenberg
- Location within Germany Location within Hesse
- Coordinates: 51°7′N 9°40′E
- Country: Germany
- State: Hesse
- Admin. region: Kassel
- District: Schwalm-Eder-Kreis
- Subdivisions: 13 Stadtteile

Government
  - Mayor (2021–27): Andreas Rehm

Area
  - Total: 97.71 km^{2} (37.73 sq mi)
- Elevation: 200–530 m (660–1,740 ft)

Population (2025-12-31)
  - Total: 5,844
  - Density: 59.81/km^{2} (154.9/sq mi)
- Time zone: UTC+01:00 (CET)
  - Summer (DST): UTC+02:00 (CEST)
- Postal codes: 34286
- Dialling codes: 05663
- Vehicle registration: HR
- Website: www.spangenberg.de

Spangenberg (German pronunciation: [ˈʃpaŋənbɛʁk]) is a small town in northeastern Hesse, Germany.

== Geography ==
Spangenberg lies in the Schwalm-Eder district some 35 km (22 mi) southeast of Kassel, west of the Stölzinger Gebirge, a low mountain range. Spangenberg is the demographic centrepoint of Germany.

== History ==
The town of Spangenberg had its first documented mention in 1261, at about the time when the Treffurt family ruled Spangenberg.

== Historic sights ==
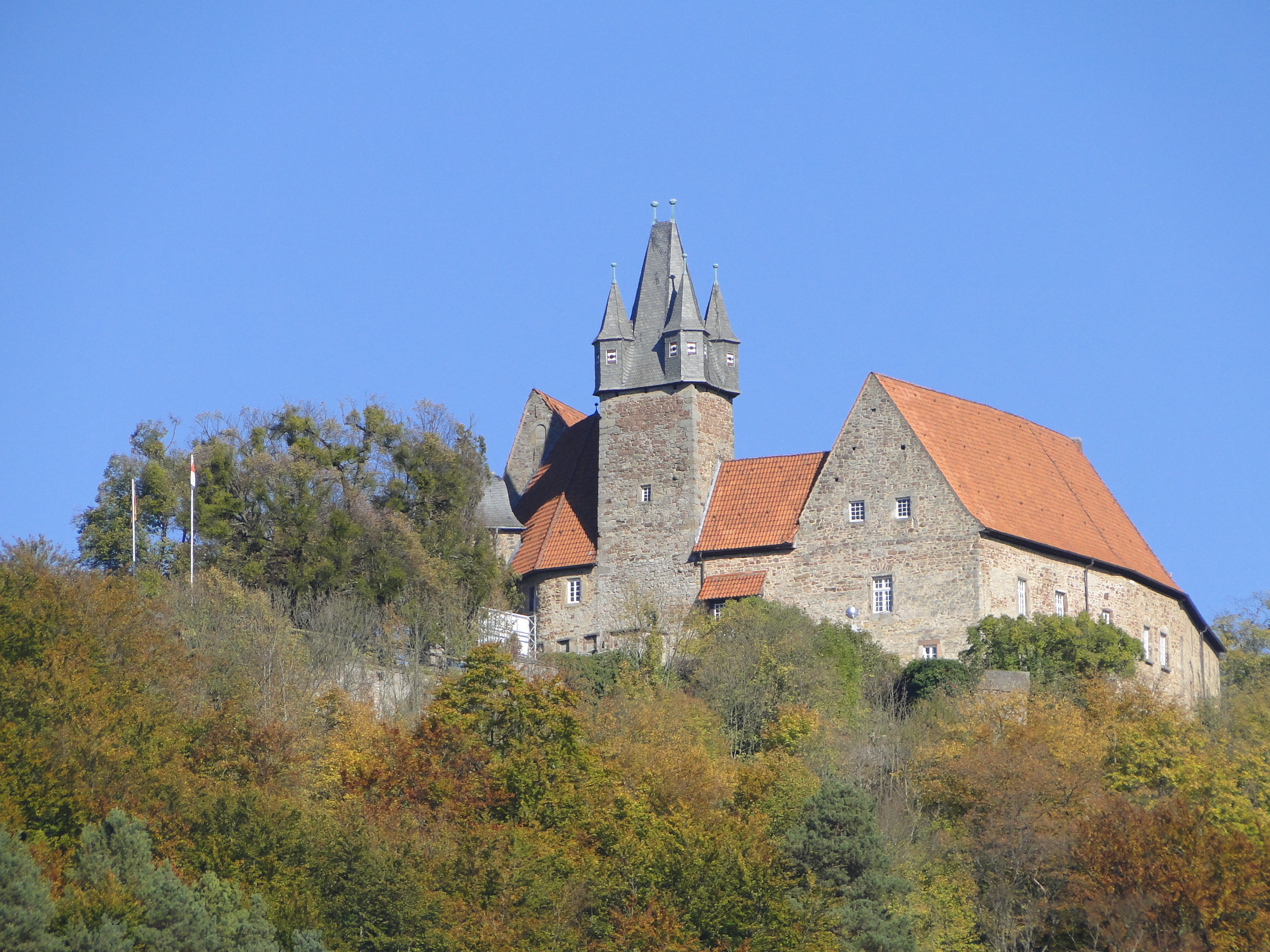
Schloss Spangenberg

The town is known for Spangenberg Castle, built in 1253. There are also half-timbered buildings in the Old Town and the remains of the town's old wall, several of whose towers are still standing.

In World War II, Spangenberg Castle was used as a prisoner of war camp, Oflag IX-A/H. There was a second camp a few miles to the south - Oflag IX-A-Z.

== Coat of arms ==
Spangenberg's civic coat of arms is based on the town's oldest known seal from 1317. The object on the viewer's right (heraldically speaking, the left, as the shield is considered from the point of view of the bearer) side is a kind of fossilized plant locally known as a Spange (also German for "brooch" or "clip"), the town's namesake. The item on the viewer's left (heraldic right) is half of a wheel. Wheels are common in German civic heraldry, usually indicating some connection to the Archbishopric of Mainz, whose arms include wheels in honor of St. Willigis. The current colours – red and gold – have been in use since 1621.

== Constituent communities ==
In alphabetical order, these are Bergheim, Bischofferode, Elbersdorf, Herlefeld, Kaltenbach, Landefeld, Metzebach, Mörshausen, Nausis, Pfieffe, Schnellrode, Vockerode-Dinkelberg and Weidelbach.

== Partnerships ==
Spangenberg maintains partnerships with the following places:

- (Germany) Treffurt, Thuringia since 1990
- Saint-Pierre-d'Oléron, Charente-Maritime, France since 1997
- Pleszew, Poland since 1997

== Oflag IX-A/H ==
Oflag IX-A/H was a Nazi prison, housing prisoners of war captured by the Germans in World War II. The prison was in Spangenberg Castle.

=== Notable Prisoners in Oflag IX-A/X ===
Anthony Barber Dominic Bruce Aiden Crawley Harry Day Victor Fortune Guy Griffiths John Frost Bruce Shand Brian Duncan Shaw

== Notable people ==
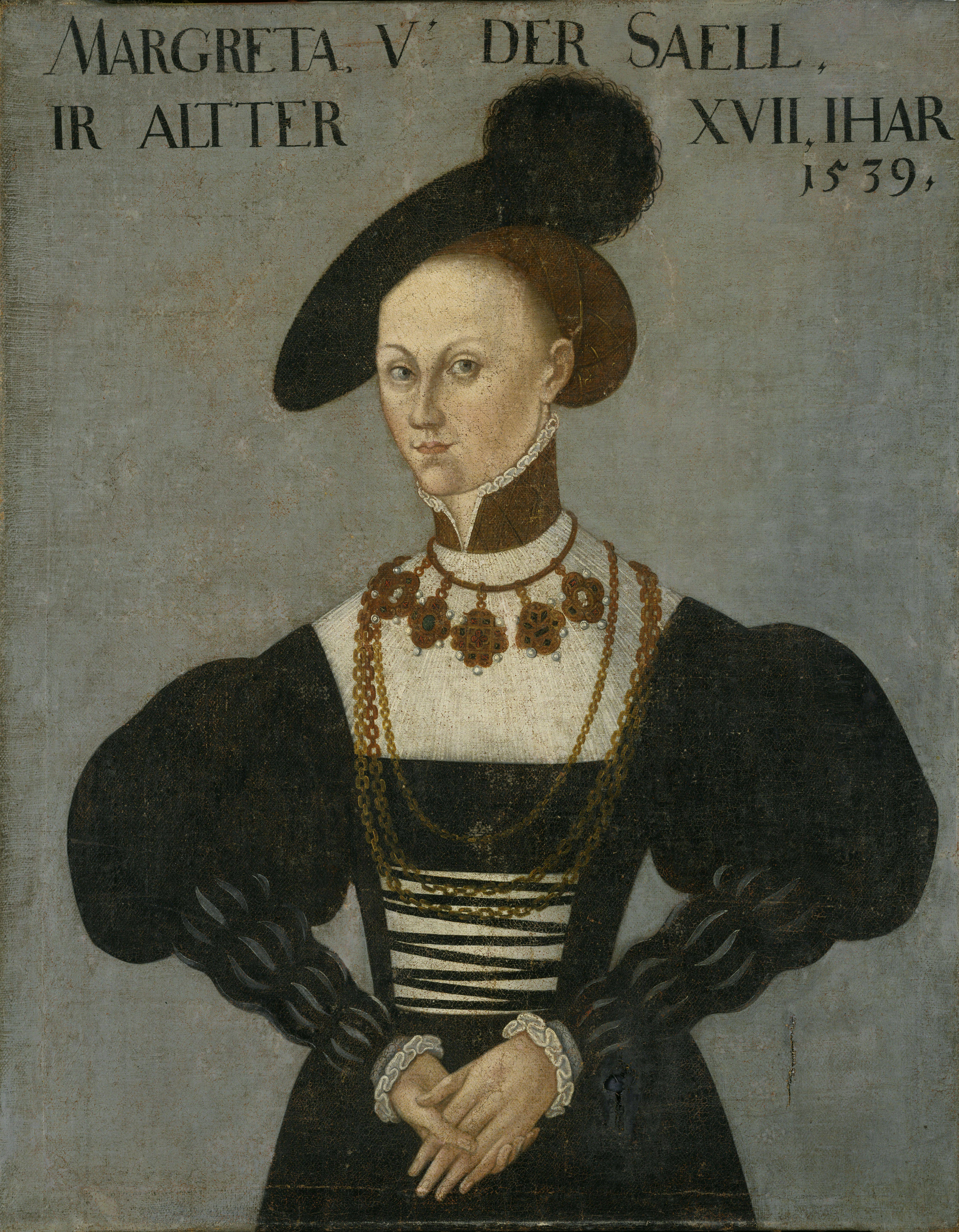
Margarethe von der Saale

- Henry II, Landgrave of Hesse (before 1302-1376), Landgraf, resided at Schloss Spangenberg
- Hermann II, Landgrave of Hesse (1341-1413), Landgraf, resided at the castle
- William I, Landgrave of Lower Hesse (1466-1515), Landgraf, died at Schloss Spangenberg
- Philip I, Landgrave of Hesse (1504-1567), Landgraf, lived at Schloss Spangenberg
- William IV, Landgrave of Hesse-Kassel (1532-1592), Landgraf, gave the castle its present form
- Margarethe von der Saale (1522-1566), sister of Philip the Magnanimous, lived in the castle seat, her grave is in the city church of St. John
- Hans Wilhelm Kirchhof (1525-1605), Burggraf on Schloss Spangenberg
- Michael Rutschky (born 1943), writer, grew up in Spangenberg
