= Pfieffe (Fulda) =

River in Germany

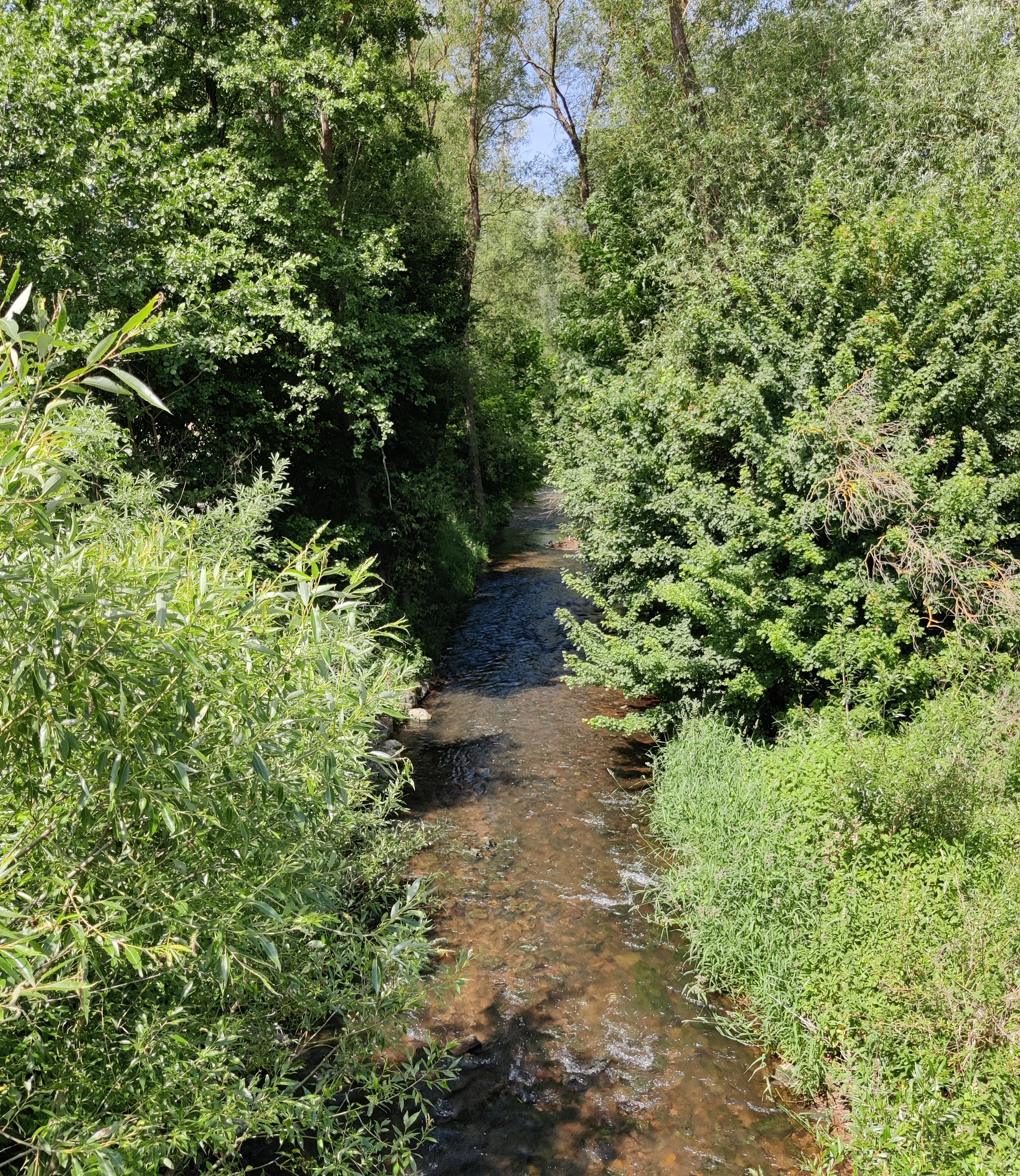

Location
- Country: Germany
- State: Hesse

Physical characteristics
- Mouth
  - location: Fulda
  - coordinates: 51.1117°N 9.5468°E
- Length: 21.4 km (13.3 mi)

Basin features
- Progression: Fulda→ Weser→ North Sea

Pfieffe is a river of Hesse, Germany. It flows into the Fulda near Melsungen.

== See also ==
- List of rivers of Hesse
