= 2014 in literature =

This article contains information about the literary events and publications of 2014.

== Events ==
- January – Parts of two previously unknown poems by the female Greek poet Sappho are discovered on ancient papyrus. This is reported by several news sources by the end of the month.
- January 18 – The first books are transferred from the old to the new National Library of Latvia in Riga.
- March 6 – Joseph Boyden's novel The Orenda wins the 2014 edition of Canada Reads.
- April 24 – Writers including Mark Haddon and Mary Beard join a campaign against a ban on sending books to U.K. prison inmates.
- May 22 – J. R. R. Tolkien's 1926 translation of Beowulf is first published. (His essay "On Translating Beowulf" had appeared in 1940).
- June 10 – As part of a Northern Iraq offensive, ISIL and aligned Salafi jihadist forces take Mosul, leading to extensive book burning at its libraries, as part of the destruction of cultural heritage by ISIL.
- November 25 – Discovery of a previously unknown copy of the First Folio of Shakespeare's plays (1623) in the public library at Saint-Omer in northern France is announced.

== Anniversaries ==
- 28 January – On this day 75 years ago, W. B. Yeats died in Menton, France.
- 5 February – William Burroughs was born in 1914 (100th Anniversary)
- 21 February – Christopher Marlowe's 450th birthday celebrated (may or may not be his birthday)
- 1 March – On this day 100 years ago, Ralph Ellison (author of Invisible Man) was born.
- 9 March – Charles Bukowski died 20 years ago today (1994).
- 10 March – On this day 50 years ago, John Updike receives the National Book Award for The Centaur.
- 31 March – 100th anniversary of the birth of the Nobel Prize-winning Mexican poet Octavio Paz in 1914.
- 4 April – Marguerite Duras was born in 1914 (100th Anniversary)
- 14 April – On this day 75 years ago, The Grapes of Wrath by John Steinbeck was published.
- 16 April – Ralph Ellison dies on this date 20 years ago in 1994. (see March 1 above for Ellison links)
- 18 April – On this day 40 years ago (1974) the first printing of J. M. Coetzee's debut novel Dusklands appeared in hardback.
- 23 April – It is assumed that William Shakespeare was born on this day 450 years ago (because records show that he was baptised on 26 April).
- 26 April – The centenary of Bernard Malamud's birth (April 26, 1914).
- May – The 100th anniversary of Gertrude Stein's Tender Buttons.
- 16 June – This year's Bloomsday celebration will also mark the 100th anniversary of the publication (June 1914) of Joyce's Dubliners.
- 21 September – the 50th anniversary of the publication of Herzog by Saul Bellow, the second of his three National Book Award-winning novels.
- 7 July – Sir Walter Scott's debut novel, Waverley, was published (anonymously) 200 years ago today.
- 22 September – Alain-Fournier died in action in northern France 100 years ago today, just a year after the publication of his only novel, Le Grand Meaulnes.
- 27 October – Dylan Thomas was born a hundred years ago.
- 18 November – Margaret Atwood celebrates her 75th birthday today.
- 2 December – The Marquis de Sade died 200 years ago today.

== New books ==
=== Fiction ===
Dates after each title indicate U.S. publication, unless stated otherwise.

- Belinda Alexandra – Sapphire Skies (Australia)
- Jacob M. Appel – Scouting for the Reaper (February 15)
- Kate Atkinson – A God in Ruins (UK)
- Margaret Atwood – Stone Mattress – Nine Tales (September 16)
- Bandi – The Accusation (Korean language short stories, South Korea, May)
- Natalie Baszile – Queen Sugar (February 6)
- Pierce Brown – Red Rising (January 28)
- Jessie Burton – The Miniaturist (UK)
- Rosa da Silva (Sigrid Shreeve) – Jabujicaba (UK)
- Anthony Doerr – All the Light We Cannot See (May 6)
- Ceridwen Dovey – Only the Animals (April 23)
- Elizabeth Dutton - Driftwood
- David Grossman – A Horse Walks into a Bar: A novel (In original Hebrew as סוס אחד נכנס לְבָּר (Soos Echad Nechnas L'bar), Israel)
- John Hornor Jacobs – The Incorruptibles (UK)
- Marlon James – A Brief History of Seven Killings (October 2)
- Stephen King
  - Mr. Mercedes (June 3)
  - Revival (November 11)
- Thomas King – The Back of the Turtle
- Paul Kingsnorth – The Wake (UK, April?)
- Herman Koch – Geachte heer M. (Dear Mr. M., Netherlands)
- Niviaq Korneliussen – Homo Sapienne (Greenland)
- Laila Lalami – The Moor's Account (September 9)
- S. E. Lister – Hideous Creatures (UK, May)
- Édouard Louis (born Eddy Bellegueule) – En finir avec Eddy Bellegueule (translated as The End of Eddy, France, February)
- Jennifer Nansubuga Makumbi – Kintu (Ugandan-born author published in Kenya)
- Emily St. John Mandel – Station Eleven (Canada)
- Javier Marías – Así empieza lo malo (Thus Bad Begins) (Spain)
- Sean Michaels – Us Conductors (Canada, April 8)
- Karen Miller – The Falcon Throne (September)
- Haruki Murakami – Colorless Tsukuru Tazaki and His Years of Pilgrimage (translation, August 12)
- Rick Riordan – The Blood of Olympus (October 7)
- Rudy Ruiz – Seven for the Revolution
- Samanta Schweblin – Distancia de rescate (translated as Fever Dream, Argentina)
- Roger Scruton – Notes from Underground (March 12)
- Akhil Sharma – Family Life
- Joss Sheldon – Involution & Evolution (August 4)
- Leïla Slimani – Dans le jardin de l'ogre (France)
- Ali Smith – How to Be Both (UK, August 28)
- Miriam Toews – All My Puny Sorrows
- Olga Tokarczuk – The Books of Jacob (Księgi Jakubowe) (Poland, October)
- Niall Williams – History of the Rain
- Ivan Baran – Enzolart (first book in The Black Books Cycle)

=== Children and young people ===
- Chris Van Allsburg – The Misadventures of Sweetie Pie
- David Almond
  - A Song for Ella Grey
  - The Tightrope Walkers
- Connah Brecon – There's This Thing
- A. F. Harrold – The Imaginary
- John Hornor Jacobs – The Shibboleth
- J. Patrick Lewis (with Gary Kelley) – Harlem Hellfighters
- Katherine Rundell – Rooftoppers
- Jon Scieszka – Frank Einstein and the Antimatter Motor (first in the Frank Einstein series of four books)
- R. A. Spratt – Friday Barnes
- Maggie Stiefvater – Blue Lily, Lily Blue (third book in The Raven Cycle, October 21)
- Zoe Sugg – Girl Online (UK, November 25)

=== Drama ===
- Mike Bartlett – King Charles III
- Rona Munro – The James Plays
- John Patrick Shanley – Outside Mullingar

=== Poetry ===
- Rosemary Tonks (posthumous) – Bedouin of the London Evening (selected poetry and prose)

=== Non-fiction ===
- Leo Babauta – The Little Book of Contentment
- Alan Cumming – Not My Father's Son
- Lindsay David – Australia: Boom to Bust
- Mark Felton – Zero Night
- Ruben Flores – Backroads Pragmatists: Mexico's Melting Pot and Civil Rights in the United States
- William H. Frey – Diversity Explosion
- Michael Gross – House of Outrageous Fortune
- Christophe Guilluy – La France périphérique
- Madhu Kishwar – Modi, Muslims and Media: Voices from Narendra Modi's Gujarat
- Naomi Klein – This Changes Everything: Capitalism vs. the Climate
- Philip Lymbery and Isabel Oakeshott – Farmageddon
- Helen Macdonald – H is for Hawk (UK, July)
- Rajiv Malhotra – Indra's Net
- Lucy Mangan – Inside Charlie's Chocolate Factory
- L. A. Paul – Transformative Experience
- Winifred Phillips – A Composer's Guide to Game Music
- Claudia Rankine – Citizen: An American Lyric
- Roger Scruton
  - How to Be a Conservative (UK, September 11)
  - The Soul of the World
- Douglas Vakoch – Archaeology, Anthropology, and Interstellar Communication
- Erik Voskuil – Before Mario

== Deaths ==
Birth years link to the corresponding "[year] in literature" article,

- January 4 – Jean Metellus, Haitian neurologist, author, poet, and playwright (born 1937)
- January 14 – Juan Gelman, Argentine poet, 83 (born 1930)
- January 28 – Nigel Jenkins, Welsh poet, journalist, and geographer, 64 (born 1949)
- January 29 – Hashem Shabani, Iranian poet, 32, (hanged, born c. 1982)
- February 18 – Mavis Gallant, Canadian writer of short stories, 91 (born 1923)
- March 2 – Justin Kaplan, American writer, editor and biographer, 88 (born 1925)
- March 18 – Catherine Obianuju Acholonu, Nigerian researcher and poet,
- April 2
  - Glyn Jones, South African actor and screenwriter (born 1931)
  - Urs Widmer, Swiss author and playwright (born 1938)
- April 5 – Peter Matthiessen, American novelist, naturalist and wilderness writer, 86 (born 1927)
- April 10
  - Doris Pilkington Garimara (Nugi Garimara), Aboriginal novelist, 77 (born 1937)
  - Sue Townsend, English comic novelist and playwright, 68 (born 1946)
- April 15 – Rosemary Tonks, English poet, prose writer, and children's writer (born 1928)
- April 17 – Gabriel García Márquez, Colombian Nobel laureate, 87 (born 1927)
- April 20 – Alistair MacLeod, Canadian writer, 77 (born 1936)
- April 24 – Tadeusz Różewicz, Polish poet, dramatist and writer, 92 (born 1921)
- May 6 – Farley Mowat, Canadian author and environmentalist, 92 (born 1921)
- May 21 – Ruth Guimarães, Afro-Brazilian classicist, fiction writer and poet, 93 (born 1920)
- May 28
  - Maya Angelou, American author, poet and civil rights activist, 86 (born 1928)
  - Oscar Dystel, American paperback publisher, 101 (born 1912).
- June 19 – Josephine Pullein-Thompson, English children's novelist, 90 (born 1924)
- June 22 – Felix Dennis, English publisher and poet, 67 (born 1947)
- June 23 – Nancy Garden, American author (born 1938)
- June 25 – Ana María Matute, Spanish writer, 88 (born 1925)
- June 29 – Dermot Healy, Irish poet, playwright, fiction writer and memoirist. 66 (born 1947)
- July 4 – C. J. Henderson, American author and critic, 62
- July 7 – Sheila K. McCullagh, English children's writer (born 1920)
- July 13 – Nadine Gordimer, South African writer, anti-apartheid activist, and Nobel Peace Prize laureate, 90 (born 1923)
- July 20 – Thomas Berger, American writer, 93 (born 1924)
- August 1 – Jan Roar Leikvoll, Norwegian novelist, 40 (brain tumour, born 1974)
- August 2
  - Billie Letts, American novelist, 73 (born 1938)
  - James Thompson, American-Finnish author, 49 (born 1964)
- September 4
  - Orunamamu, American-Canadian author, story-teller and educator, 93 (born 1921)
  - Edgar Steele, American lawyer and author, 69 (born 1945)
- September 21 – Linda Griffiths, Canadian playwright, 60 (born 1953)
- September 24 – Hugh C. Rae (Jessica Stirling, etc.), Scottish novelist, 79 (born 1935)
- September 28 – Dannie Abse, Welsh poet and physician, 91 (born 1923)
- November 27 – P. D. James, English crime writer, 94 (born 1920)
- November 29 – Mark Strand, Canadian-born American poet and writer, United States Poet Laureate, 80 (born 1934)
- November 30
  - Radwa Ashour, Egyptian writer and academic, 68 (born 1946)
  - Kent Haruf, American novelist, 71 (born 1943)
- December 3 – Vicente Leñero, Mexican writer and journalist, 81 (born 1933)
- December 12 – Norman Bridwell, American author and illustrator, 86 (born 1928)
- December 24 – Lee Israel, American biographer and literary forger, 75 (born 1939)

== Awards ==
- Akutagawa Prize: Hiroko Oyamada for Ana (Hole) and Tomoka Shibasaki for Haru No Niwa (Spring Garden)
- Anisfield-Wolf Book Award: A Constellation of Vital Phenomena by Anthony Marra
- Baileys Women's Prize for Fiction: A Girl Is a Half-formed Thing by Eimear McBride
- Caine Prize for African Writing: Okwiri Oduor, "My Father's Head"
- Camões Prize: Alberto da Costa e Silva
- Costa Book of the Year: H is for Hawk by Helen Macdonald
- Danuta Gleed Literary Award: Paul Carlucci, The Secret Life of Fission
- Dayne Ogilvie Prize: Tamai Kobayashi
- Desmond Elliott Prize: A Girl Is a Half-formed Thing by Eimear McBride
- DSC Prize for South Asian Literature: Chronicle of a Corpse Bearer by Cyrus Mistry
- Dylan Thomas Prize: To Rise Again at a Decent Hour by Joshua Ferris
- European Book Prize: Pascale Hugues, Hannah's Dress, and Anthony Giddens, Turbulent and Mighty Continent
- Folio Prize: Tenth of December: Stories by George Saunders
- Friedenspreis des Deutschen Buchhandels: Jaron Lanier
- German Book Prize: Kruso by Lutz Seiler
- Goldsmiths Prize: How to Be Both by Ali Smith
- Gordon Burn Prize: The Wake by Paul Kingsnorth
- Governor General's Award for English-language fiction: Thomas King, The Back of the Turtle
- Governor General's Award for French-language fiction: Andrée A. Michaud, Bondrée
- Governor General's Awards, other categories: See 2014 Governor General's Awards.
- Grand Prix du roman de l'Académie française: Adrien Bosc, for Constellation
- International Prize for Arabic Fiction: Frankenstein in Baghdad by Ahmed Saadawi
- International Dublin Literary Award: Juan Gabriel Vásquez, The Sound of Things Falling
- Kerry Group Irish Fiction Award: A Girl Is a Half-formed Thing by Eimear McBride
- Lambda Literary Awards: Multiple categories; see 26th Lambda Literary Awards
- Lannan Lifetime Achievement Award: Steve Erickson
- Man Booker Prize: The Narrow Road to the Deep North by Richard Flanagan
- Miles Franklin Award: All The Birds, Singing by Evie Wyld
- National Biography Award: The Ambitions of Jane Franklin: Victorian Lady Adventurer by Alison Alexander
- National Book Award for Fiction: to Redeployment by Phil Klay
- Nobel Prize in Literature: to Patrick Modiano
- PEN/Faulkner Award for Fiction: We Are All Completely Beside Ourselves by Karen Joy Fowler
- Pulitzer Prize for Fiction: The Goldfinch by Donna Tartt
- Pulitzer Prize for Poetry: 3 Sections by Vijay Seshadri
- Rogers Writers' Trust Fiction Prize: Miriam Toews, All My Puny Sorrows
- SAARC Literary Award: Tarannum Riyaz
- Samuel Johnson Prize: H is for Hawk by Helen Macdonald
- Scotiabank Giller Prize: Sean Michaels, Us Conductors
- Golden Wreath of Struga Poetry Evenings: Ko Un
- Walter Scott Prize: An Officer and a Spy by Robert Harris
- Zbigniew Herbert International Literary Award: Charles Simic
