= The Skinny (magazine) =

Scottish monthly magazine

- Categories: Music, arts, culture, listings
- Frequency: Monthly
- Circulation: 32,191 (ABC, 31 December 2014)
- Publisher: Radge Media C.I.C.
- First issue: May 2005
- Country: Scotland
- Website: theskinny.co.uk

The Skinny is a monthly free magazine distributed in venues throughout the cities of Dundee, Edinburgh and Glasgow in Scotland. Founded in 2005, the magazine features interviews and articles on music, art, film, comedy and other aspects of culture across Scotland and beyond.

On 10 September 2026, The Skinny announced that the September issue would be their last.

== History ==
The Skinny was founded and launched in 2005 as a free Edinburgh and Glasgow listings magazine. From the outset, the magazine secured interviews with high-profile music acts, including Mogwai, Pearl Jam, Wu-Tang Clan, DJ Shadow and Muse as well as becoming early champions for Scottish bands such as Frightened Rabbit and The Twilight Sad.

In August 2006, The Skinny formed a partnership with established Edinburgh Festival magazine Fest. The first year of this partnership saw the publication renamed SkinnyFest, before it reverted to the title Fest in 2007.

In September 2007, The Skinny began the annual publication of a Student Guide. The guide is distributed through a number of Scottish universities and art colleges.

The Skinny launched a Northwest edition in April 2013, focusing on cultural happenings in Manchester and Liverpool. In September 2016, this was expanded to include Leeds; the Northwest edition was discontinued in 2017.

In 2020 during the COVID-19 pandemic, The Skinny suspended its publication and furloughed the majority of its staff between April and September. The magazine ran a successful crowdfunding campaign to finance its return, raising over £16,000 of donations in under a month.

In 2021, The Skinny launched new city guides to the magazine's home cities of Glasgow and Edinburgh. The guides were reissued in 2022, alongside a guide to Christmas and Hogmanay in Scotland.

In 2022, The Skinny launched a new fortnightly film podcast, The Cineskinny. In December, The Skinny celebrated its 200th print issue with a party at Summerhall in Edinburgh. The party also acted as a fundraiser for Tiny Changes, the charity founded by the family of late Frightened Rabbit frontman Scott Hutchison.

On September 10, 2026, The Skinny announced that it will be ceasing operations.

== Content ==
As a listings magazine, The Skinny largely runs content that relates to events taking place within its catchment area during the month covered by the issue. This consists for the most part of previews, reviews, and feature interviews.

In March 2007, the magazine secured the first UK interview with Arcade Fire after the release of hit album Neon Bible. The following month, it secured the first UK magazine cover for the band Battles in anticipation of the release of their debut album Mirrored. In June 2008, the magazine said that they would dedicate an entire issue to sex workers. Scottish author Alasdair Gray provided a self-portrait for the magazine's November 2010 cover.

Recent musicians featured on the cover of The Skinny include Run the Jewels, Wet Leg, Sacred Paws and The Pictish Trail, with many of the magazine's covers featuring illustrations and artworks by Scotland-based artists and designers. In February 2023, Young Fathers hosted a 'takeover' of The Skinny, with the band co-commissioning a selection of feature articles and discussing the influences behind their album Heavy Heavy.

== Associations ==
The Skinny has established itself as a 'media partner' and sponsor for a range of events, including Edinburgh International Film Festival, Edinburgh International Book Festival, Edinburgh Festival Fringe, Edinburgh Art Festival, the Scottish Album of the Year Award and dozens of music festivals across the UK and Europe.

The Skinny has hosted writer development programmes with organisations such as Disability Arts Online and the Edinburgh International Festival. The magazine has also collaborated with a variety of Scottish arts organisations on publishing projects. In 2023, The Skinny worked with Film Hub Scotland to produce a new 32-page magazine dedicated to Scottish independent cinema.

The Skinny has been media partners of the Royal Scottish Academy's New Contemporaries exhibition since its inception, and, as of 2023, sponsors an annual prize at the exhibition.

== Awards ==
In 2006, Jasper Hamill won the Press Gazette / Reuters Student Interviewer of the Year, for his piece "Another View" – an interview with avant-garde musician John Cale.

The Skinny won Print Publication of The Year in 2011 and 2012 at the Scottish New Music Awards.

Writers from The Skinny have been shortlisted in The PPA Scotland Awards' Young Journalist of the Year in each year since the award's inception in 2018. Megan Wallace won the Young Journalist of the Year award in 2019, Iana Murray won the award in 2020, and the magazine's Intersections editor Eilidh Akilade won the award in 2022. The Skinny Guide To Edinburgh was also nominated for Best Brand Extension at the 2021 PPA Scotland Awards.

== Notable contributors ==
- Sean Michaels, Scotiabank Giller Prize-winning author of Us Conductors
- Lauren Mayberry, musician and lead singer of Chvrches
- Scott Hutchison, artist, writer and frontman of Frightened Rabbit

== Promotions ==
In November 2011, the Advertising Standards Authority determined that the publication had breached CAP Code (Edition 12) rules 3.1, 3.3 (Misleading advertising), 8.2 and 8.15 (Sales promotions) in a promotion shown in the April edition. This was due to an insufficient deadline being provided for a non time-specific prize which was administered in conjunction with Edinburgh International Science Festival.

== See also ==
- List of magazines published in Scotland
