= New Finn =

Finnish resident without an ethnic Finnish background

New Finns (Finnish: uussuomalainen) are those people in Finland’s population who have a non-ethnic Finnish background and who reside permanently in the country. A new Finn may have various backgrounds; including immigrant, immigrant-origin, refugee and/or having come to Finland for family reasons. The term is especially used to emphasize those that have a Finnish citizenship and carry Finnish passports, to those foreigners who live permanently in Finland and intend to be naturalized in Finland at some point in the future. Finland has experienced large-scale, continuous non-European immigration only after the 1990s. The term uussuomalainen is beginning to come into usage to commonly refer to these new, naturalized Finns, who are beginning to change and affect the national landscape of the country.

The term and its usage over the more conservative "immigrant" has received mixed reactions and stirred conversation on whether new terms like this are in fact necessary. The term is currently not in mainstream use and is mostly used in political context.

New Finns are affecting the national psyche of Finland because they are becoming a new, different cultural force of their own who are reshaping the national consciousness as to who a Finn can and cannot be.

New Finns in general:

1. reside permanently in Finland
2. adopt the Finnish language as their own, the exception are those New Finns who live in predominantly Swedish-speaking island or coastal areas such as the Åland or majority Swedish-speaking towns like Närpes.
3. have attained Finnish citizenship, or wish to eventually receive Finnish citizenship
4. move to Finland from another country or are born in Finland to parents or a parent who is not Finnish
5. do not consider themselves to be ethnically Finnish but just Finnish
6. assign their cultural identity to their geographic location. Finland is their home, and since geographically they are in Finland, they are Finns.
7. have a background as an immigrant, immigrant background, refugee or someone who moved to Finland for family reasons

The term uussuomalainen also describes the descendants of immigrants better than the term "immigrant", because these people have in many cases been born and raised in Finland to parents from other countries.

== Famous new Finns ==
Many first and second generation immigrant background new Finns are well known in the cultural circles in Finland. Some well-known new-Finn writers are Toivo Flink, Neil Hardwick, Alexis Kouros, Zinaida Lindén, Harri István Mäki, Hella Wuolijoki, Jutta Zilliacus, Jason Tiilikainen, Arvi Perttu, Ranya Paasonen, Jim Thompson, Umayya Abu-Hanna and Wilson Kirwa. Sofi Oksanen has written about the plight of new-Finn women in today's Finland.

== Demographics ==
For statistics, in 2024:

- 184,838 new Finns had a dual citizenship
- 411,101 new Finns had a foreign citizenship
- 583,155 new Finns were born outside of Finland
- 610,148 new Finns had a native language other than Finland's official languages of Finnish, Swedish or Sámi
- 623,949 new Finns had both parents born abroad

A total of 11.1% of Finns had a foreign-background in 2024. The top 20 countries of origin for New Finns were Russia, Estonia, Iraq, Somalia, Ukraine, China, India, the Philippines, Vietnam, former Yugoslavia, Afghanistan, Turkey, Iran, Thailand, Syria, Bangladesh, Nepal, Pakistan, Sri Lanka and Sweden. The municipality with the highest proportion of Finns with a foreign-background was Vantaa at over 29%. Espoo (25%), Mariehamn (23%), Närpes (23%), Helsinki (21%), Kerava (17%), Jakobstad (17%) and Turku (17%) also had higher proportions of New Finns.
