= Emma Healey (Canadian writer) =

Canadian writer and poet

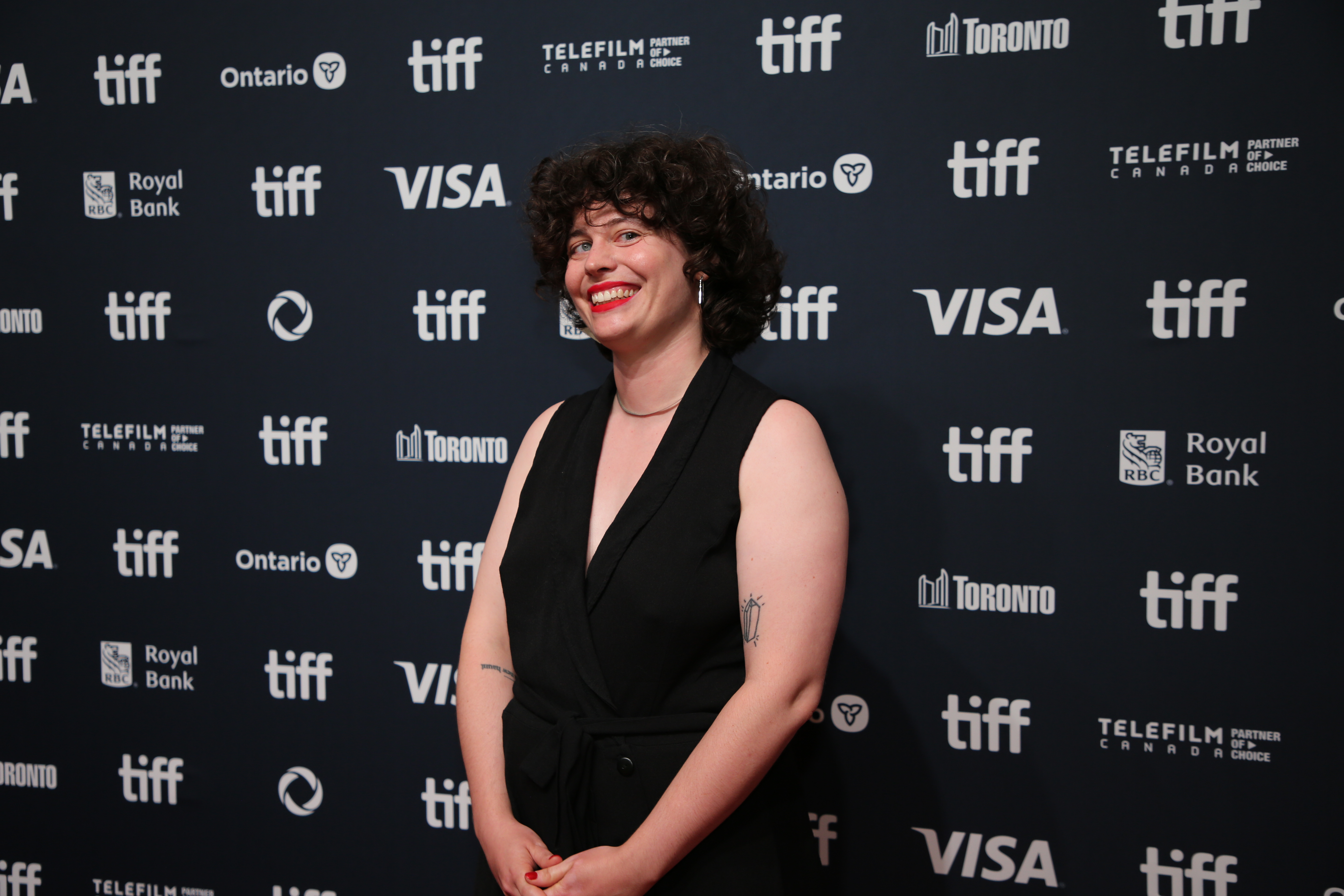
- Healey at the 2024 Toronto International Film Festival
- Born: January 10, 1991 (age 35); Toronto, Ontario, Canada
- Education: Concordia University
- Website: www.emmahealey.com

Emma Flannery Lawrence Healey (born January 10, 1991) is a Canadian writer and poet from Toronto, Ontario.

== Early life and education ==
Healey was born in Toronto, Ontario, on January 10, 1991, to actor and playwright parents. She was named after Jane Austen's character, Emma, and writer Flannery O'Connor. Healey has stereoblindness, having been born blind in one eye. She studied creative writing at Concordia University, spending a year on exchange at University College Cork. While at Concordia she was twice awarded the Irving Layton Award for Creative Writing.

== Writing ==
Begin With the End in Mind, Healey's first collection of poetry, was published in 2012. It was selected by poet and writer Stan Rogal in 2015 as the reason he viewed Healey as an up-and-comer to watch. Her second collection of poetry, Stereoblind, was released by House of Anansi Press in 2018. The collection deals in part with learning that the name of her visual condition had a name. The front cover art was designed by her then roommate, artist Layne Hinton. Healey's book Best Young Woman Job Book was released by Random House in 2022. The memoir tracks Healey's career through a series of odd jobs that haven't aligned with her initial idea of what it would mean to be a writer. Canadian author and commentator, Elamin Abdelmahmoud, said of her writing in the book as having "flare and style and an incredibly infuriating amount of skill".

Healey was the poetry critic for The Globe and Mail from 2014 to 2016. She has also been a regular contributor to the music blog Said the Gramophone. In April 2018, Healey was Open Book's writer in residence.

In a 2014 The Hairpin article Healey wrote about her experience dating an anonymous faculty member, which began as consensual but was ultimately defined by an imbalance of power. Initially ignored by Concordia, attention was drawn to the article in 2018 after former Concordia student, Mike Spry, wrote about the toxicity of the writing program. Author Heather O'Neill subsequently came forward as a groping victim while a student at the school, two decades earlier. In 2018, Healey filed a formal complaint against a male professor. In October 2019 it was reported that the professor was no longer working at the school.

== Works ==
- Begin With the End in Mind (2012)
- Stereoblind (2018)
- Power (2019)
- Best Young Woman Job Book: A Memoir (2022)
