= Oflag VI-B =

World War II German prisoner-of-war camp

- Warburg, North Rhine-Westphalia
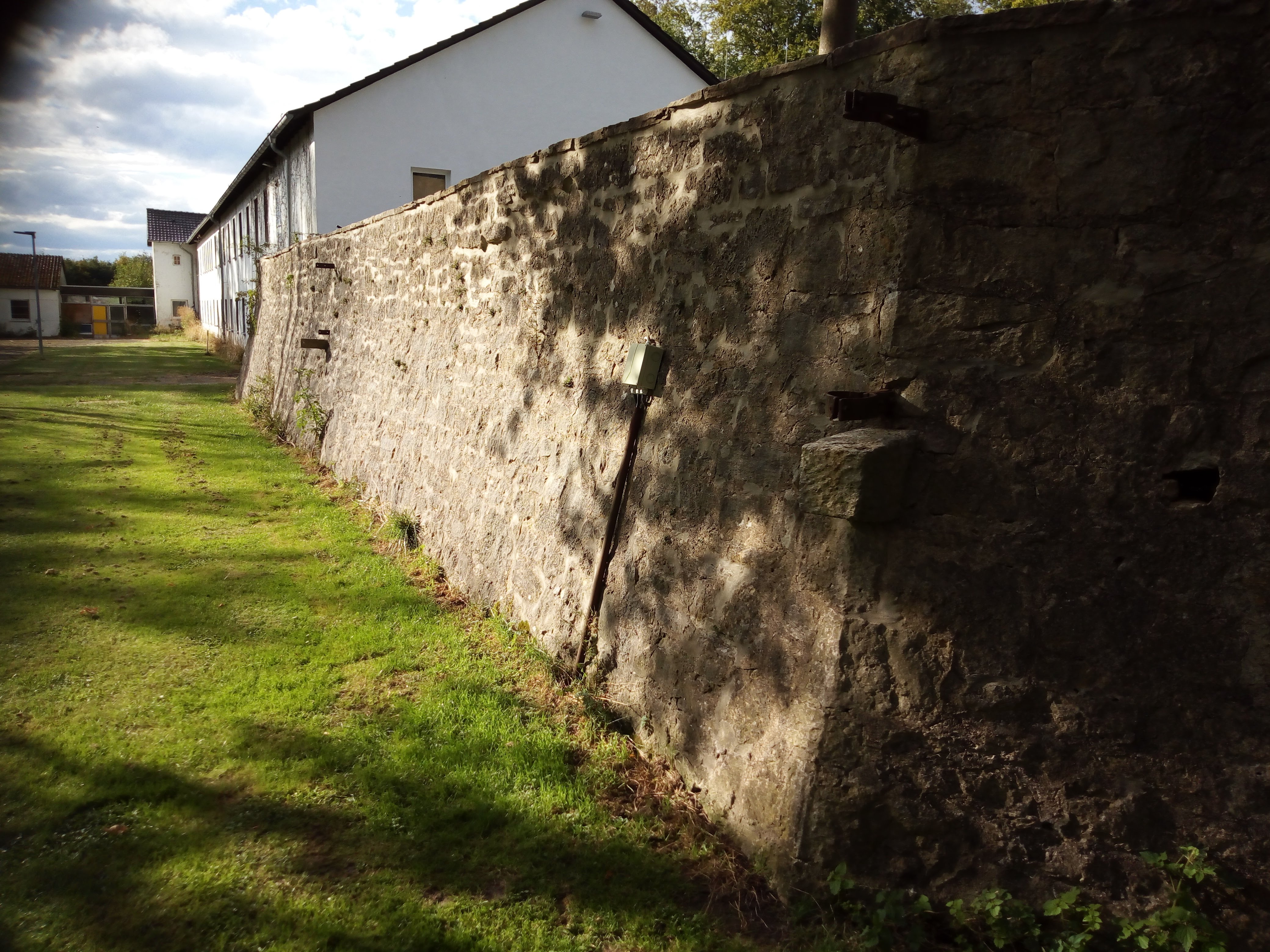
- Preserved walls of Oflag VI-B

Site information
- Type: Prisoner-of-war camp
- Controlled by: Nazi Germany

Location
- Warburg, Germany (pre-war borders, 1937)
- Location within Germany
- Coordinates: 51.51763°N 9.15169°E

Site history
- In use: 1940–1945
- Battles/wars: World War II

Garrison information
- Occupants: French, British, and Polish officers

Oflag VI-B was a World War II German prisoner-of-war camp for officers (Offizierlager), 1 km (0.6 mi) southwest of the village of Dössel (now part of Warburg) in Germany. It held French, British, Polish and other Allied officers.

== Camp history ==
In 1939, before it was a POW camp, the area was originally planned to be an airfield. The POW camp was opened in September 1940. At first French, and then British officers were housed there.

The serial escaper Eric Foster in his autobiography explained that upon arrival he chatted to a guard to ask about the conditions of the camp. Foster explained the guard confided, "the camp was a very, very bad camp indeed". Foster stressed that this guard desperately wanted the prisoners to complain about the conditions, with the guard believing that if they harassed the camp command about the conditions, the camp would be closed down. The guard, who wanted an easier posting also stated to Foster, "We are prisoners as much as you are." Foster explained the prisoners were housed in huts which held 50 to 60 men. In 1941, all lighting was provided by two acetylene lamps in each barrack. though later on electric lighting was provided.

Eric Foster who was captured in June 1940 and up to 1942 had served time in Dulag Luft, Spangenberg, Toruń and now Warburg, made observations about camp life. He observed three types of prisoner of war inside Warburg: the Zizzer, who would be a prisoner who was happy-go-lucky; the studious type, who was always concerned he was being left behind at home and who would be catered for by the Red Cross with study classes and examinations up to first year university standard; and the escapist, which included people like himself and his friend the Polish officer Danny Krol who was described as generous and a great gambler. Król would later be executed following the escape from Stalag Luft III, known as the Great Escape. Sometimes the studious type could also be an escapist. Amongst these types was also a sprinkling of the POW Warburg eccentrics. A case study being Foster's friend F/O McHardy, who was an officer known by his comrades as 'Fou.' Fou was an artist and lived in a room at the end of Fosters hut with two other artists. They constantly challenged what was standardised. They chose to sit on the floor whilst eating meals. They went by a time system that was two hours ahead of the camps time. This time system had an advantage, in that they would find the camp stove to themselves at eating times. They also had a pet mouse called Freddie, which ate alongside them with its own bowl. In a peculiarity they had a court-martial for the mouse, after the mouse got caught stealing their food. Fou would go on to captivate and hoax an audience with a lecture about a non existent German professor's Calculus.

The camp was the setting for two remarkable escape attempts. On 1 December 1941 Flt Lt Peter Stevens RAFVR, disguised as a German Unteroffizier, led a party of 10 POWs disguised as orderlies, and two more disguised as guards complete with dummy rifles, up to the gates of the camp. The sentry was not satisfied with their gate pass, so Stevens marched his party back into the camp. As the sentry was apparently unaware that the party was not genuine, a second attempt was made a week later. This time the sentry demanded to see their Army paybooks, so the escape party fled, although two, Pete Tunstall and Dominic Bruce were eventually arrested after a camp search by Major Rademacher found a piece of cloth on them that was used to create the sentry uniforms.

On 30 August 1942 the camp was the scene of "Operation Olympia", also known as the "Warburg Wire Job", another mass escape attempt. After RAOC officer Major B.D. Skelton ("Skelly") Ginn fused the perimeter floodlights, 41 prisoners carrying four 12-foot (3.7 m) scaling ladders made from bed slats rushed to the barbed-wire fence and clambered over. One ladder collapsed, so of the 41 involved, only 28 escaped the camp, and only three of those made it home.The three that made it were Henry Coombe-Tennant (MC), Rupert Fuller and Albert Arkwright.

In September 1942 the British prisoners were transferred to other camps, and were replaced with Polish officers, with 1,077 brought from Romania, where they had been interned since September 1939, and another 1,500 transferred from other camps in Germany. At various points in time up to 2296 officers and 287 non-commissioned officers were housed in the camp.

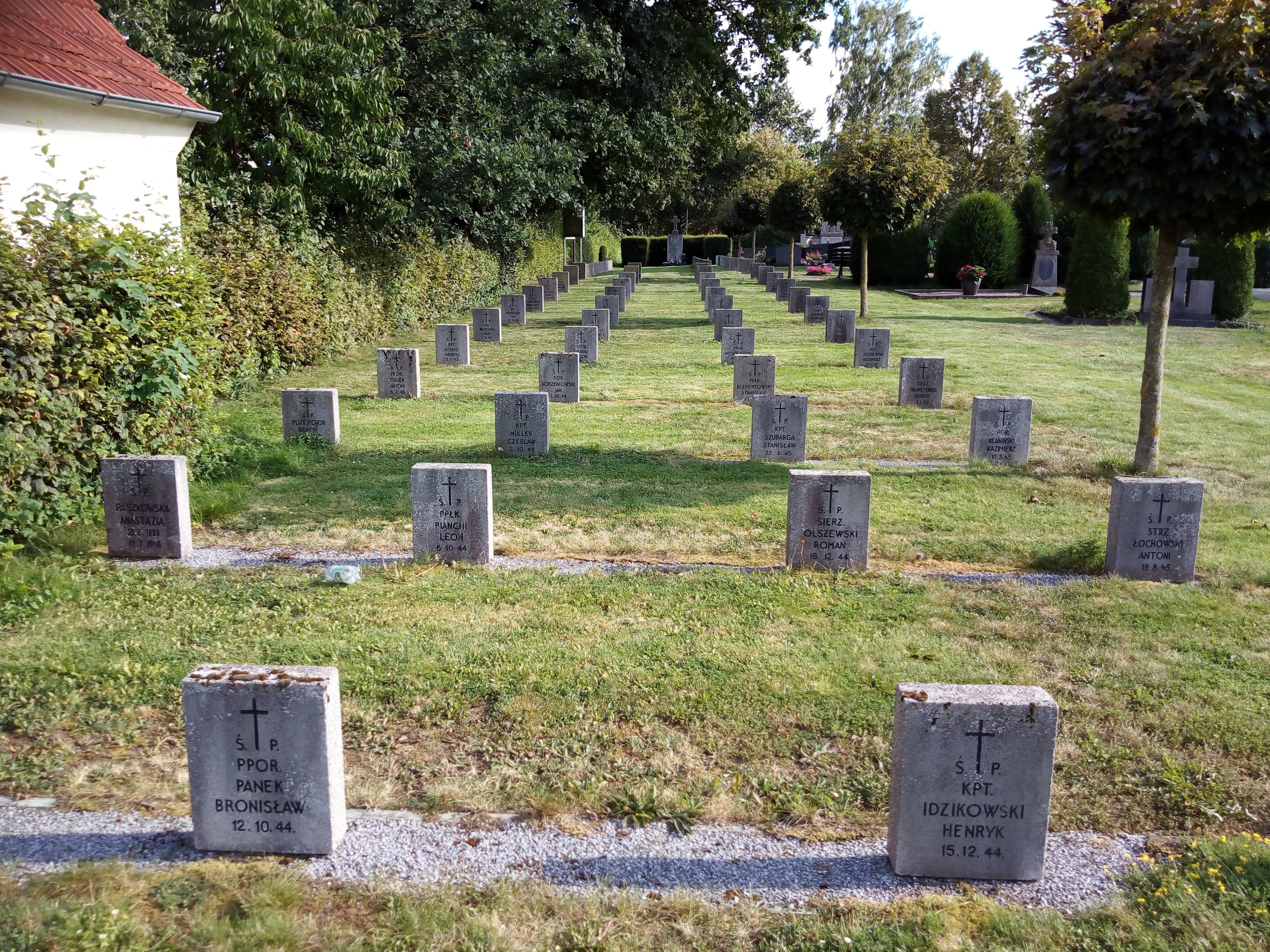
Graves of Polish prisoners of war who died or were killed in the camp

The British had begun an escape tunnel, and the Poles continued working on it, and on 20 September 1943, 47 of them escaped. Within four days, 20 had been captured and returned to the camp. They were then transported to the Buchenwald concentration camp and executed. In the next few days 17 more were captured and taken to the Gestapo prison in Dortmund where they were killed. Only 10 managed to remain free, some returning to Poland, others finding their way to the Allied lines.

British prisoners were taught by one officer, Major Alexis Casdagli, to sew with unravelled jumpers and needles and threads from Red Cross parcels, and they made bookmarks or embroidered letters home with symbols of freedom such as butterflies.

On the night of 27 September 1944 British aircraft attacking the nearby railroad junction in Nörde, dropped some bombs on the camp, killing 90 officers. Altogether 141 prisoners died in Oflag VI-B. They are buried in the cemetery near the centre of the village of Dossel. A memorial was erected there in 1985.

The camp was liberated by the U.S. Army on 3 April 1945.

== Aftermath ==
In 1960 Polish survivors organized the Klub Dösselczyków. Journals of ex-Polish prisoners are kept in the Central Prisoners of War Museum in Łambinowice, near Opole, Poland.

== Notable inmates ==
- Wg Cdr Douglas Bader RAF, legless British air ace (October 1941 to May 1942).
- P/O Josef Bryks, Czechoslovak RAFVR fighter pilot and serial escaper (October 1941 – June 1942).
- Lt Peter Conder, ornithologist and Director of the RSPB
- Generał dywizji Walerian Czuma, commander in the siege of Warsaw, September 1939
- Władysław Dobrowolski, Polish Olympic medalist in fencing
- Flt Lt Sydney Dowse, RAFVR pilot and Great Escape survivor.
- Lt Jock Hamilton-Baillie, serial escaper.
- Wincenty Kawalec, Polish Ministry of Labour (1972–74), Polish Central Statistical Office President (1965–72), escaped from Oflag VI-B on 20 September 1943
- Adam Rapacki, Polish Foreign Secretary (1956–68)
- Squadron Leader Pete Tunstall RAF, who served more time in solitary confinement than any other British POW
- Flying Officer Dominic Bruce RAF, the "Medium Sized Man" of Colditz

== See also ==
- List of prisoner-of-war camps in Germany
- Oflag
- Zero Night
