= Friday Barnes, Under Suspicion =

Australian children's novel by R. A. Spratt

- First edition
- Author: R. A. Spratt
- Cover artist: Lilly Piri
- Language: English
- Genre: Children's novel
- Published: 2015 (Random House Australia)
- Publication place: Australia
- Media type: Print (paperback)
- Pages: 260
- ISBN: 9781742759647
- OCLC: 885432631
- Preceded by: Friday Barnes, Girl Detective
- Followed by: Friday Barnes, Big Trouble

Friday Barnes, Under Suspicion is a 2015 Children's novel by R. A. Spratt. It is the second book in the Friday Barnes book series and continues the adventures of Friday, a boarding school girl, who solves mysteries.

== Publication history ==
- 2015, Australia, Random House Australia ISBN 9781742759647
- 2016, Phil Grosier (illus.), 272p. USA, Roaring Brook Press ISBN 9781626722996

== Reception ==
A review of Friday Barnes, Under Suspicion in Kirkus Reviews wrote "Spratt continues to hit just the right mix of dry humor and suspense.". In a similar vein, Booklist liked its humour and unusual mysteries.

Friday Barnes, Under Suspicion has also been reviewed by School Library Journal, and Horn Book Guide Reviews,

It won the 2016 Davit Award for Best Children's Crime Novel.
