= Stanisław Król =

Polish fighter pilot (1916–1944)

- Born: Stanisław Zygmunt Król; 22 March 1916; Zagorzyce, Poland
- Died: 12 April 1944 (aged 28); Breslau, Germany
- Burial place: Poznan Old Garrison Cemetery, Poland
- Military career
- Allegiance: Poland
- Branch: Polish Air Force; Royal Air Force (Free Polish Air Force)
- Service years: 1937–1944
- Rank: Flying Officer and porucznik
- Nickname: Danny
- Service number: P.0237
- Unit: No. 74 Squadron RAF
- Conflicts: World War II: Invasion of Poland; Channel Front (POW)
- Awards: Mentioned in Despatches

Stanisław Zygmunt "Danny" Król (22 March 1916 – 12 April 1944) was a Polish Supermarine Spitfire fighter pilot flying from England when he was taken prisoner during the Second World War. He is notable both as a persistent escaper and for the part he played in the 'Great Escape' from Stalag Luft III in March 1944 being one of the men recaptured and shot by the Gestapo.

== Early life ==
Król was born in Zagorzyce, Kielce, Poland. He gained a high school diploma and joined the Corps of Cadets No.3 Polish Air Force at Chelm on 21 September 1937. He completed basic military training with No. 4 Infantry Regiment and in January 1938 commenced aviation training at the Aviation Cadet School Dęblin preparing to fly as a fighter pilot. He was a championship standard fencer.

== War service ==
He was commissioned as a second lieutenant on 1 September 1939, but the aircraft at Dęblin for this group of cadets were destroyed by bombing when the Germans invaded Poland, so the cadets were evacuated to Romania on 17 September 1939. He escaped from an internment camp there and reached the port of Balchik sailing on 15 October 1939 to Beirut aboard the ship "Aghios Nikolaos". At Beirut, he boarded the French ship "Ville de Strasbourg" and reached Marseille, France, where he joined the Free Polish Air Force in France, training at Lyon with Morane fighter aircraft.

On 1 March 1940, he was with a group of Poles assigned to the air base at Tours to fly the Potez 25 while observers and gunners were training. The Germans invaded France and the French surrendered before he was involved in any combat. He flew to Bordeaux and on 23 June 1940 he boarded the French ship "President Del Piaz" and sailed to Oran from where he sailed on a British ship to England. In England, Król continued to fly and was commissioned as a pilot officer in the Free Polish Air Force. He was posted to No. 57 and later No. 7 Operational Training Unit at RAF Hawarden to complete training as a Supermarine Spitfire pilot. On 6 May 1941, Król was posted to No. 74 Squadron RAF at Gravesend in Kent as a pilot officer to fly bomber escort missions over the English Channel and Occupied France.

== Prisoner of war ==
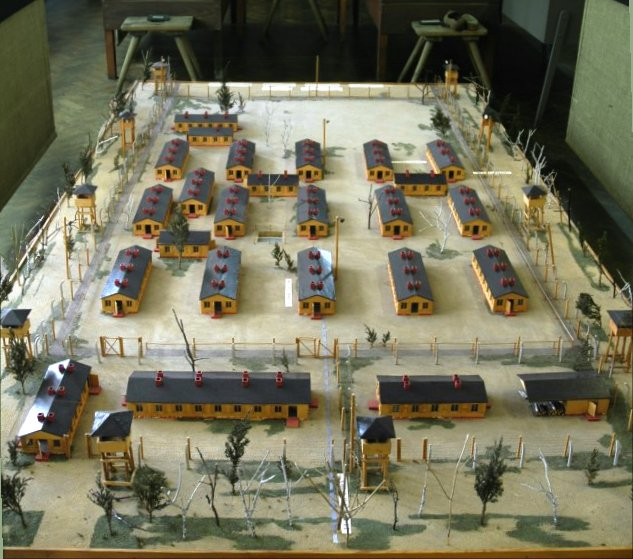
Model of Stalag Luft III prison camp.

On the afternoon of 2 July 1941, Król was flying Supermarine Spitfire Mark V (serial number "W3263") on his eleventh sortie, a fighter sweep in the area of St Omer when he was shot down by a Messerschmitt Bf 109 over France. He was captured and went straight into the prison camp system as prisoner of war number 1392.

He passed through several camps including Oflag VIB at Warburg before the Germans adopted a policy of banishing persistent trouble-makers and escapers to Stalag Luft III in the province of Lower Silesia near the town of Sagan (now Żagań in Poland). He was amongst the early groups of arrivals in late spring 1942 and he immediately began preparing to escape. Król and his friend, Flight Lieutenant Sydney Dowse, attempted to escape by cutting through the barbed wire perimeter fence in late 1942. They were caught in the act and lucky not to be shot by the guard who preferred to recapture them. In March 1943, he and Sydney Dowse participated in a tunneling escape attempt which failed and saw them back in the "cooler".

From May 1943, he joined Roger Bushell's escape organisation and was recognised as an efficient tunneller. His efforts as a pathfinder digger were rewarded with placement near the start of the queue of the escape tunnel.

== The great escape ==
Król was one of the 76 men who escaped the prison camp on the night of 24–25 March 1944 in the escape now famous as "the Great Escape". He was amongst the initial group out of the tunnel who needed a head start in order to get to the local railway station and catch their appropriate trains. However, his escape partner Sydney Dowse was delayed and then an air raid closed down the station causing them to change their plan. Instead of taking a direct railway journey to Berlin, where they planned to hole up in a known safe address arranged by a friend of Dowse before making for Danzig hoping for a ship to Sweden, they began walking east to Poland to find friends of Król's. He posed as a Slav worker on leave and Dowse as a Danish worker.

Memorial to "The Fifty" down the road toward Żagań (Kiewnarski at right)

For twelve days and nights they marched through the snow following the railway lines eastwards past Liegnitz and Breslau remaining at large longer than almost all of the escapers. On 6 April 1944, the Germans circulated "wanted posters" with their photographs and, just 2 miles from the Polish frontier, they were arrested in a barn by a Hitler Youth member and some Home Guard (sic) men. They were placed in prison at Oels or Olesnica and visited by agents of the Breslau Gestapo on 11 April 1944. During interrogation, Sydney Dowse was told that he was being sent to Berlin for further interrogation as this was his fourth escape and that Król was to go back to Stalag Luft III. Dowse was removed to Berlin and later to the concentration camp at Sachsenhausen. Król was never seen alive again after 12 April 1944. Król was one of the 50 escapees who had been listed by SS-Gruppenfuhrer Arthur Nebe for execution so he was amongst those executed by the Gestapo. He was cremated at Breslau. His remains are now buried in part of the Poznan Old Garrison Cemetery where his headstone shows the rank Kapitan. He is commemorated on the Polish Air Force Memorial at Northolt, Middlesex. Unusually, his name was not on the list of murdered officers which was published by newspapers on 20 May 1944.

Nationalities of the 50 executed
21 British
6 Canadians
6 Polish
5 Australians
3 South Africans
2 New Zealanders
2 Norwegians
1 Belgian
1 Czechoslovak
1 Frenchman
1 Greek
1 Lithuanian

== Awards ==
His conspicuous bravery as a prisoner was recognised by a Mention in Despatches as none of the other relevant decorations then available could be awarded posthumously.

He also received the Polish Cross of Valour and was twice awarded their Air Medal.

He also was a member of the Caterpillar Club and efforts are currently being made to return his pin to his family.

== Other victims ==
The Gestapo executed a group of 50 of the recaptured prisoners representing almost all of the nationalities involved in the escape. Post-war investigations saw a number of those guilty of the murders tracked down, arrested and tried for their crimes.
