= Sydney Dowse =

Royal Air Force officer (1918–2008)

Sydney Hastings Dowse
- Sydney Dowse in RAF service prior to becoming a POW
- Born: 21 November 1918; Hammersmith United Kingdom
- Died: 10 April 2008 (aged 89); Hampshire, United Kingdom
- Military career
- Allegiance: (United Kingdom) British Empire
- Branch: Royal Air Force
- Service years: 1937–1946
- Rank: Flight lieutenant
- Nickname: The Laughing Boy
- Units: No 608 Squadron; No 1 Photographic Reconnaissance Unit
- Conflicts: World War II
- Awards: Military Cross mentioned in despatches

Flight Lieutenant Sydney Hastings Dowse MC (21 November 1918 – 10 April 2008) was a Royal Air Force pilot who became a prisoner of war and survived The Great Escape during the Second World War.

== Early life and RAFVR ==
Born in Hammersmith, Sydney was educated at Hurstpierpoint College. In July 1937, he joined the recently formed Royal Air Force Volunteer Reserve and learnt to fly at weekends. At the outbreak of war in September 1939, he was called up for regular service and completed his pilot training. He was commissioned as a pilot officer on 21 October 1940, with seniority from 9 August 1940.

He joined No 608 Squadron attached to Coastal Command flying Avro Ansons on anti-submarine and convoy escort operations. At the end of 1940, he volunteered to join No 1 Photographic Reconnaissance Unit (PRU) flying Spitfires.

He was mentioned in despatches on 11 June 1942 and promoted to flight lieutenant on 21 October 1942, with seniority from 9 August 1942.

Dowse was shot down on 20 August 1941 while on a reconnaissance mission to photograph the German battleships Scharnhorst and Gneisenau at Brest. He was wounded in the leg and quickly captured by the Germans, becoming a prisoner of war.

== Prisoner of war ==
=== Early escape attempts ===
His first escape attempt came on 1 December 1941, when he was recovering from the leg wound sustained when he was shot down. He escaped from a hospital at Stadtroda in Thuringia. However, Dowse was recaptured three days later attempting to cross the Dutch-German border.

His next attempt was from Stalag IX-C at Bad Sulza on 21 January 1942. He exchanged identities with a Canadian POW and joined a work party. He managed to slip away unnoticed when outside the camp. After travelling some distance by train to Werwitz, he continued on foot, through deep snow, towards the German-Belgian frontier where he was re-captured five days later, suffering from extreme exhaustion and exposure.

Following a brief period in hospital, he was transferred to Oflag VI-B at Warburg.

At Warburg, he participated in the excavation of an escape tunnel, which was completed on 18 April 1942. He, and 34 others (including the legless air ace, Douglas Bader, and Dowse's later escaping partner, Stanislaw Krol), prepared to escape. However, as the tunnel broke surface, it became clear that it was slightly too short, and the exit hole had emerged directly in the patrol path of a German sentry. Six RAF officers managed to escape, but, due to the proximity of the sentry, no one else, including Dowse, was able to do so.

=== Stalag Luft III ===
In May 1942, Dowse was transferred to Stalag Luft III at Sagan with a batch of other RAF officers.

Dowse's next escape attempt happened on 30 November 1942, when he and Flt Lt Stanisław 'Danny' Krol cut through the wire into the camp's central compound and crawled across that compound using blankets as camouflage. They were in the process of cutting the perimeter wire to get out when they were arrested and sentenced to 14 days' solitary confinement.

Dowse, who spoke some German, befriended a German corporal who worked alongside Dowse in the camp's censor office. From this contact, Dowse was able to gain useful information and documents which aided the camp escape organisation. He was able to 'borrow' a genuine gate pass, which was copied by the camp's forgery department, and a copy was used on the delousing break mass escape in June 1943.

Through this same contact, Dowse was able to gain information about the German secret rocket establishment at Peenemünde. This information was passed on to British intelligence via secret codes written into POWs' letters home.

Dowse also learnt that the Gestapo had liquidation plans for Roger Bushell if he were caught escaping again. Dowse warned Bushell, who chose to ignore the warning.

=== The Great Escape ===
During his time in the North Compound at Stalag Luft III, Dowse became involved with the construction of the three tunnels intended for a mass escape, masterminded by Roger Bushell, Harry Day and Canadian Wally Floody, who was instrumental in the tunnel's design and construction. One tunnel, codenamed 'Harry' which Dowse had helped build, was completed in early 1944.

On 24 March 1944, he took part in The Great Escape through tunnel 'Harry', escaping with Flt Lt Stanisław Krol. Dowse had drawn escape number 21, and was disguised as a Danish foreign worker, equipped with the appropriate (forged) documents and clothing provided by his 'contact'.

Dowse and Krol travelled mainly by foot towards the Polish border, but were recaptured just inside Germany on 6 April 1944. They were amongst the last escapers to be re-captured. Taken to the local Gestapo headquarters, they were interrogated, before being separated.

Dowse was sent to Sachsenhausen concentration camp. Stanisław 'Danny' Krol was among the 50 recaptured officers to be executed.

=== Sachsenhausen concentration camp ===
At Sachsenhausen, Dowse found himself with three fellow survivors of the 'Great Escape': (Harry Day, Johnnie Dodge and Bertram James). They were placed in Sonderlager A (Special Camp A) within the main camp. Here were housed a handful of other 'political' prisoners, including SOE agent Peter Churchill, two Russian generals, various other Russians, Poles, Italians and four British soldiers of Irish origin. Later, they were joined by British Commando Jack Churchill.

Dowse and James almost immediately began another tunnel, which was kept secret from all non-British personnel. This was completed and used on the night of 23 September 1944, when Dowse, James, Day, Dodge and Jack Churchill escaped.

Dowse paired up with Day and they travelled by train into Berlin. However, they were recaptured the next day when hiding in a bombed out house in the Berlin suburb of Mahlsdorf.

Placed in the death cells back at Sachsenhausen, all the escapers who had been re-captured were spared execution mainly thanks to Day's efforts under interrogation.

In April 1945, after spending several months in solitary confinement Dowse, together with other prominent prisoners (Prominenten), was transferred to the Tyrol via concentration camps at Flossenburg and Dachau.

He was awarded the Military Cross for his services as a POW. This award was published in the London Gazette on 16 August 1946.

== Later life ==
Dowse served as an equerry at Buckingham Palace. For a number of years in the 1950s, at the time of the communist insurgency, he worked in Malaya as a rubber plantation manager in the Penang Settlement. After the war, he also worked, possibly unwittingly, for a short time as a representative for Bernie Cornfeld's insurance fraud, "The Dover Plan", as well as other unsuccessful and/or dubious ventures. He lived mainly on his heroic stories from the war, which were a laissez passer in post-war society.

He married three times

He returned to Stalag Luft III in March 1994 and March 2004 to mark the anniversaries of the Great Escape, and to commemorate his friends who did not survive.
