= The Back of the Turtle =

2014 novel by Thomas King

- First edition cover
- Author: Thomas King
- Language: English
- Genre: Fiction
- Publisher: HarperCollins
- Publication date: 2014
- Publication place: Canada
- Media type: Print (hardback & paperback)
- Pages: 518 pp.
- ISBN: 978-1-4434-3162-0
- OCLC: 890680218

The Back of the Turtle is a novel by Thomas King. Published by HarperCollins in 2014, the novel won the Governor General's Award for English-language fiction at the 2014 Governor General's Awards.

== Plot ==
The novel's central character is Gabriel Quinn, a successful scientist of First Nations descent working for the multinational chemical company Domidion. Gabriel returns to Samaritan Bay and Smoke River, the Indian reserve in British Columbia, planning to commit suicide because he is distraught over his role in the community's destruction where GreenSweep, the defoliant product he helped to develop for the company, destroyed the local environment and killed or drove away the community's residents. Gabriel is drawn into a journey of spiritual redemption after jumping into the water to save a group of people from drowning while he is trying to drown himself in the Pacific Ocean. While in Samaritan Bay, he meets Mara, a young woman who lost her family in "The Ruin" that Gabriel helped to create. While Gabriel meets the few people left in a seeming folk-tale-like ghost town, in Toronto, Domidion CEO Dorian Asher is drawn into a media frenzy as the company is implicated in another unfolding environmental disaster in the Athabasca Oil Sands.

== Background ==
King began writing the novel in the early 2000s while teaching at the University of Guelph, but set it aside for several years to write his non-fiction book The Inconvenient Indian, which won the RBC Taylor Prize earlier in 2014.
