= Before Mario =

2014 non-fiction book written by Erik Voskuil

Before Mario: The Fantastic Toys from the Video Game Giant's Early Days
- The book's cover, featuring an Ultra Hand
- Author: Erik Voskuil
- Language: English; French
- Genre: Non-fiction
- Published: November 20, 2014
- Publisher: Omaké Books
- Media type: Print
- Pages: 224
- ISBN: 978-2919603107

Before Mario: The Fantastic Toys from the Video Game Giant's Early Days, known in France as Before Mario: Les Jouets Qui Ont Changé le Destin du Géant Des Jeux Vidéos, is a non-fiction book written by Dutch video game collector Erik Voskuil centered around Nintendo's products prior to the Famicom. The book was published on November 20, 2014 by Omaké Books and was received positively by critics, who called the book interesting. Critics also praised the book's pictures for being "big" and "colorful".

== Contents ==
Before Mario contains 224 pages and is written in both English and French. The book features information about products produced and manufactured by Nintendo prior to the release of the Famicom in 1983. To accompany the book's text, images of the products and other related media are included in the book. Most of the book's content is product descriptions. Each product description is divided into two sections: one written in English, and one written in French. The book also features a foreword from the former general manager of Nintendo Research & Engineering, Satoru Okada.

== Background and release ==
Before Mario was written by the Dutch video game collector Erik Voskuil, who is best known for running the blog BeforeMario.com, which catalogs products made by Nintendo prior to them entering the video game market. Before Mario is a book adaption of Voskuil's blog.

Pre-orders for the book were made available in October 2014. The book was later published by the French publisher Omaké Books on November 20. A limited-edition version of the book featuring a black hardcover was also released.

== Reception ==
Before Mario was received positively by critics, who believed that Nintendo fans would "enjoy looking at each page in wonderment". The book's photos were praised, with Nintendo Life's Damien McFerran describing them as "gorgeous" and "high-quality". Critics were more negative towards the book's product descriptions, due to them being "short". Nintendo Life felt that the book "perfectly illustrates" the impact that video game designer Gunpei Yokoi left on Nintendo.

Nintendo World Report's Justin Berube directed criticism towards the book's formatting, stating that the book "sometimes mixes up" the side containing English text. Berube was also critical towards the short length of the product descriptions. Overall, however, Berube was positive to the book and although he found it hard to recommend as the best history book covering Nintendo, he still called it "the best Nintendo coffee table book on the market". Jeremy Parish of USgamer stated that the book "offers the physicality of a nicely printed hardcover", but criticized how the book is in both English and French, as it removed space for more detailed product descriptions.
