= Zero Night =

2014 book by Mark Felton

- Author: Mark Felton
- Language: English
- Subject: Military history
- Published: 2014
- Publisher: Icon Books (UK)
- Publication place: England
- Media type: Print (hardback)
- Pages: 320
- ISBN: 9781848317925
- OCLC: 906817098

Zero Night: The Untold Story of the Second World War's Most Daring Great Escape is a 2014 book by Mark Felton. It is about the 1942 mass allied escape from the German prisoner-of-war camp Oflag VI-B.

== Reception ==
Zero Night has generally been well received. The Wall Street Journal wrote:

From the book’s subtitle (“The Untold Story of World War II’s Greatest Escape”) through its text, “Zero Night” invites comparison with Paul Brickhill’s “The Great Escape” (1950), which recounts a later Allied breakout. The latter is a better book, more polished, the prisoners—and even the Germans—depicted more three-dimensionally. (It’s relevant to note that Brickhill was a POW in the camp from which his subjects escaped.) Moreover, I couldn’t help wondering if Mr. Felton overidealizes the officer POWs in “Zero Night.” .. But escape narratives are almost always foolproof—i.e., suspenseful—and the events chronicled in “Zero Night,” diligently assembled by Mr. Felton, are engrossing enough to keep readers reading through to the end. ... Films like “The Great Escape” and “Von Ryan’s Express” are fun escapist (no pun intended) fare. But a book like “Zero Night” reminds us that the real Allied escapees were often far more enthralling and admirable than those movies’ characters could ever be.

Gulf News calls it "nothing short of a thriller, where the plot is laid out, preparation progresses stage-by-stage and finally brought to fruition." while News Weekly wrote "Zero Night is a fascinating recount of this lesser known escape story, and would appeal to a wide range of readers." Kirkus Reviews in a star review called it "a page-turner" and "exciting" and Kim Kovacs from BookBrowse called the book "fascinating and meticulously researched" but noted that "Felton soft-peddles the adversity and privation, putting them well in the background and choosing to emphasize the action-adventure aspect of the planning and execution of the escape" and that she "felt like the author took liberties in creating conversational scenes, which detracted from the book's overall impact as a work of nonfiction."
