= Mark Felton =

English YouTuber, writer, and historian (born 1974)

Mark Felton FRHistS
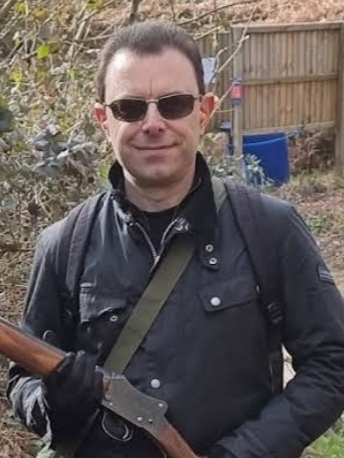
- Felton in 2023
- Born: 1974 (age 51–52); Colchester, Essex, England
- Education: Anglia Polytechnic University (BA); University of Essex (PGCert, MA, PhD)
- Occupations: YouTuber; writer; historian
- Years active: 2005–present
- Notable work: Zero Night
- Television: Combat Trains; Top Tens of Warfare; Evolution of Evil
- Children: 1

YouTube information
- Channels: Mark Felton Productions; War Stories with Mark Felton
- Years active: 2017–present
- Genre: History
- Subscribers: 2.41 million
- Views: 1.05 billion
- Last updated: 14 June 2026
- Website: markfelton.co.uk

Mark Felton (born 1974) is a British YouTuber, writer, and historian. He has written non-fiction books and is a YouTuber with channels on 20th and 21st century topics, mainly related to World War I, World War II, and the Cold War. Felton has taught at the University of Essex and at universities in China, as well as being featured on television as a military history commentator.

== Early life and education ==
Felton was born in 1974 in Colchester, Essex, where he attended the Philip Morant School. Felton sat for a BA degree in history and English at Anglia Polytechnic University. He also holds a postgraduate certificate in political science, an MA in Native American studies, and a PhD in history, all from the University of Essex. Felton's doctoral thesis, titled "Resistance in exile: Sitting Bull and the Teton Sioux in Canada, 1876-1881", was in the field of Native American studies.

== Career ==
Felton taught at the University of Essex and worked in a junior role at the local Colchester facility of the Benefits Agency (a former social security agency of the British government) before moving to China for nine years, where he was a part-time English teacher at Shanghai University and Fudan University. In 2013, he was a volunteer for the Royal British Legion in Shanghai, helping to organise Poppy Appeals. Staff at the British Consulate in Shanghai and Felton were involved in identifying gravestones of British soldiers killed by Japanese military personnel in 1937.

Felton has appeared on television as a military history commentator, including in the series Combat Trains (History Channel), and Evolution of Evil (American Heroes Channel). His book Zero Night was about an escape from a German prisoner of war camp; Zero Night was optioned in 2016 by Essential Media for film development. In 2016, Felton's book Castle of the Eagles: Escape from Mussolini's Colditz, which concerns the escape of British soldiers from Vincigliata Castle near Florence in 1943, was optioned for film development by Entertainment One.

In October 2017, Felton started a YouTube show, titled Mark Felton Productions, which covers various 20th century topics.

In October 2019, Center Street released his Operation Swallow: American Soldiers' Remarkable Escape From Berga Concentration Camp, which covers illegal mistreatment by German personnel of US prisoners of war in Nazi captivity in the Battle of the Bulge. For the book, Felton referred to documents and witness accounts.

In 2022, Felton was elected a Fellow of the Royal Historical Society.

== Personal life ==
Felton met Fang Fang, a Chinese law student, while she was studying at Essex University in 2002. They married the next year and live in Norwich with their son.

== Selected publications ==
- Felton, Mark (2005). Yanagi: The Secret Underwater Trade between Germany and Japan 1942-1945. Pen & Sword. ISBN 978-1844151677.
- Felton, Mark (August 2007). The Fujita Plan. Pen and Sword Books. ISBN 9781844154807.
- Felton, Mark (2007). Slaughter at Sea: The Story of Japan's Naval War Crimes. Pen & Sword. ISBN 978-1-84415-647-4.
- Felton, Mark (2009). Today is a Good Day to Fight. History Press. ISBN 978-0-75249662-7.
- Felton, Mark (2009). The Real Tenko: Extraordinary True Stories of Women Prisoners of the Japanese. Pen & Sword. ISBN 978-1-84884550-3.
- Felton, Mark (2010). 21st Century Courage: Stirring Stories of Modern British Heroes. Pen & Sword. ISBN 978-1-84884-073-7.
- Felton, Mark (2012). The Devil's Doctors: Japanese Human Experiments on Allied Prisoners-of-War. Pen & Sword. ISBN 978-0-19-106297-1.
- Felton, Mark (5 June 2013). Never Surrender: Dramatic Escapes from Japanese Prison Camps. Pen & Sword Military. ISBN 978-1-78159-022-5.
- Felton, Mark (2 September 2013). China Station: The British Military in the Middle Kingdom 1839–1997. Pen and Sword Books. ISBN 978-1-78159-069-0.
- Felton, Mark (2015). "The Perfect Storm: Japanese Military Brutality in World War II". In C. Carmichael; R. Maguire (eds.). Routledge History of Genocide. Routledge. doi:10.4324/9781315719054. ISBN 9781315719054.
- Felton, Mark (2016). Holocaust Heroes: Resistance to Hitler's Final Solution. Pen & Sword. ISBN 9781783400577.
- Felton, Mark (2017). Castle of the Eagles: Escape from Mussolini's Colditz. Icon Books. ISBN 978-1-78578118-6.
- Felton, Mark (2019). Operation Swallow: American Soldiers Remarkable Escape from Berga Concentration Camp. Center Street. ISBN 978-1-5460-7643-8.
