= Inside Charlie's Chocolate Factory =

2014 non-fiction work by Lucy Mangan

- Author: Lucy Mangan
- Language: English
- Genre: Non-fiction
- Published: 2014
- Publisher: Puffin Books
- Publication place: England
- Media type: Print (paperback)
- Pages: 213
- ISBN: 978-0147513489
- OCLC: 871044357

Inside Charlie's Chocolate Factory: The Complete Story of Willy Wonka, the Golden Ticket, and Roald Dahl's Most Famous Creation is a 2014 non-fiction book by Lucy Mangan. It was released at the same time as the 50th anniversary edition of Charlie and the Chocolate Factory and looks at the origin and history of that story.

== Reception ==
Inside Charlie's Chocolate Factory has generally received good reviews. The San Diego Book Review wrote, "True fans who have grown up adoring the film, and have shared it with future generations, will revel in seeing the details of Inside Charlie's Chocolate Factory come to life and re-inspire the love for the story all over again. This is a book which must accompany viewing whichever platform your heart connects to Charlie, the boy we all dreamed we could be, befriend so we too could enjoy the spoils of the candy forest and meet the Umpa Lumpas first hand." Kirkus Reviews called it "an effusive celebration", a "chatty volume" and concluded "Mainly for die-hard Charlie and the Chocolate Factory fans who want more than the novel itself." School Library Journal wrote "Kids might be turned off by the nostalgic sensibility of the text and the sometimes over-the-top (and corny) jokes, but this title will especially strike a chord with fans of Dahl's work, students of classic children's literature, and those interested in the early days of modern publishing." and Booklist found it an "engaging tribute" and "thoughtful critique".

The Independent was more critical, "Unfortunately it (the book) ends up more like one of those glossy souvenir programmes sold at popular musicals, stuffed with celebrity non-stories and scores of colour photographs.... Mangan never really grapples with the points made by Dahl’s critics, which is a pity as she has the wit to produce a far more nuanced, less hagiographical account." and "But Mangan could have said more about the nature of the particular tune he played and how it sounds 50 years on." The Bulletin of the Center for Children's Books was more sympathetic, writing, "Some of her chapters are accessible enough to appeal to middle school, while her thoughtful analysis ... and her witty send-up of the critical reception and literary theory surrounding the book will impress readers with some literary sophistication as well as affection for Dahl." The Washington Post described the book's foreword by Sophie Dahl as "charming" and referred to Mangan's "chatty tone" but also that "she doesn't offer much to draw in non-aficionados"

A child's review in the San Francisco Book Review "wished that this book would focus more on the book rather than the movies/stage versions of the book ... note(d) that the book seems directed to an adult audience", and "recommend(ed) this book to all Roald Dahl and Charlie and the Chocolate Factory fans".

== See also ==
- Roald Dahl
