= Us Conductors =

2014 novel by Sean Michaels

- First edition cover
- Author: Sean Michaels
- Language: English
- Genre: Historical fiction
- Publisher: Random House of Canada, Tin House (United States)
- Publication date: April 8, 2014
- Publication place: Canada
- Media type: Print (hardback & paperback)
- ISBN: 978-1935639817
- OCLC: 859192091

Us Conductors is a debut novel by Canadian writer Sean Michaels. Published in 2014 by Random House in Canada and Tin House in the United States, the novel is a fictionalized account of the relationship between Léon Theremin (also known as Lev Termen), the inventor of the theremin, and Clara Rockmore, the musician regarded as the instrument's first virtuoso player.

The novel was the winner of the 2014 Scotiabank Giller Prize and the 2014 Paragraphe Hugh MacLennan Prize for Fiction at the Quebec Writers' Federation Awards. It was also a shortlisted nominee for the 2015 Amazon.ca First Novel Award, the Canadian Authors Association Award for Fiction, the Community of Literary Magazines and Presses Firecracker Award for Fiction, and the 2016 International Dublin Literary Award.

== Plot ==
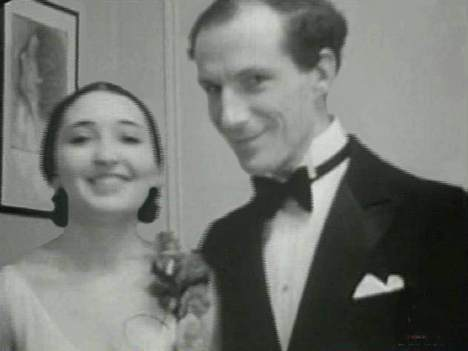
Rockmore (left) and Termen (or Theremin, right) at her birthday celebration

The novel is a fictional story telling by Russian scientist Lev Sergeyvich Termen of his own life. While he narrates the account of his life, he is captive inside the boat Stary Bolshevik and locked up inside a cabin taking him to his homeland Russia from New York. He reminisces over the years when he was young and lived in Russia. The fellow intelligent students with him who had interest in science and mathematics would keep him motivated. He developed curiosity in vacuum tubes and over the years he went on to conceptualize and invent the wonderful magic-like musical instrument Theremin in the early 1900s. Theremin becomes popular both in Russia and the United States bringing him wide spread publicity. He moves to United States and lives a life of a public figure. His stay in States is funded by Russian government in return of which he has to work as a secret agent for them. He remains a socially active person on the scenes of New York and Manhattan in 1920s and 30s where new musical life is born. His state of mind is in dilemma between the freedom and attractive life of America as against to his love and devotion to Russia. He falls in love with the musician and young violinist Clara Rockmore. When Termen reaches Russia, he find it a completely changed country from the one that he had in his memories. He is deported to a jail in Siberia. He faces the harsh Gulag system during Stalin's rule. After a term in work camp of Siberia he is shifted to a secret laboratory where he keeps missing his love and is employed to develop an eavesdropping device to use against America as well as Stalin.

== Development and publishing ==
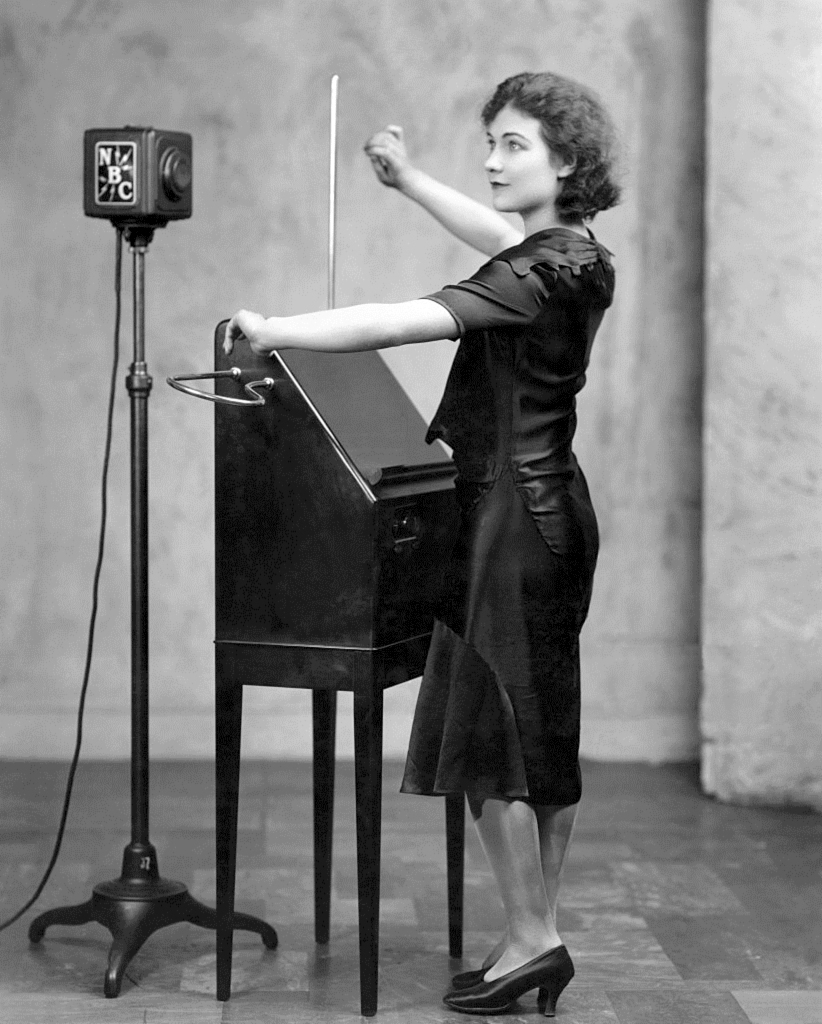
Alexandra Stepanoff playing the theremin on NBC Radio (1930)

Us Conductors is Michaels' debut novel, a fictionalized account of the relationship between Léon Theremin and Clara Rockmore. He is better known for his MP3 blog Said the Gramophone, founded in 2003. In 2009, Time Magazine ranked the blog as one of the twenty-five best blogs in the world. He has published various articles on music in a variety of publications and in 2015 was music columnist for The Globe and Mail. The novel was edited by Anne Collins and Meg Storey. It was published by Random House of Canada in Canada on April 8, 2014, and later by Tin House in the United States on June 10, 2014. Notable people like composer George Jacob Gershwin, scientist Albert Einstein, pianist Sergei Rachmaninoff, musician Glenn Miller, and politician Lavrentiy Beria find mention in the novel.

== Reception ==
Upon publication, the novel received mixed to favourable reviews. Kirkus Reviews appreciated Michaels for showing "exceptional poise and command in his debut novel" and mentioned that "both the voice and the stories it tells transcend the dusty contrivances of much historical fiction, resulting in a novel that feels both fresh and timeless." For Orlando Bird of The Telegraph, the novel has "extraordinary stories" which are "worth retelling" but "the results are mixed ... [and] can make for unsatisfying reading", as "the fiction has a hard time adding much fascination to the bare facts". Lucy Sussex of The Sydney Morning Herald mentions that "[the novel] is problematic in places, but then so is its subject" and adds that "Us Conductors is one of those books that improves as it goes on." Brendan Canning, a founding member of the band Broken Social Scene, appreciates Michaels for "delving into Termen's one true obsession, Clara, reflecting his never-ending inner dialogue with her that continues for days, months, years." and calls it as "a novel of epic proportions". Matthew Adams writing for The National compares the novel with Vladimir Nabokov's 1947 novel Bend Sinister and calls it "a debut that is charming, amusing, often deeply affecting".

== Awards ==
Michaels won the Scotiabank Giller Prize for this debut novel. The prize included a cash remuneration of $100,000. The jury for the award were Canadian author Shauna Singh Baldwin, British novelist Justin Cartwright, and American writer Francine Prose. Michaels was nominated for the award along with David Bezmozgis (The Betrayers), Frances Itani (Tell), Heather O'Neill (The Girl Who Was Saturday Night), Miriam Toews (All My Puny Sorrows), and Padma Viswanathan (The Ever After of Ashwin Rao). The citation for the award reads that "he succeeds at one of the hardest things a writer can do: he makes music seem to sing from the pages of a novel." In his acceptance speech for the award, Michaels said that as a new author, the award is an "unimaginable gift".

The novel also won 2014 Paragraphe Hugh MacLennan Prize for Fiction at the Quebec Writers' Federation Awards. The novel was nominated for the 2015 Amazon.ca First Novel Award, the Canadian Authors Association Award for Fiction, the Council of Literary Magazines and Presses Firecracker Award for Fiction, and the 2016 International Dublin Literary Award.
