= Jabujicaba =

Eco-thriller novel by Rosa da Silva

Jabujicaba is a 2014 eco-thriller novel written by Sigrid Shreeve under the pen name Rosa da Silva. It is the story of Carmen Macedo, a Black journalist born in Brazil who is adopted and raised in England who rediscovers her roots during an investigation into an eco-disaster in the Amazon rainforest.

Jabujicaba was published in 2014 in English and is part of a grass-roots environmental movement. It is the flagship project of Voices for Nature Ltd, a not-for-profit company based in England. Voices for Nature was set up to support and promote artistic projects in all media that relate to the conservation of flora and fauna in and from Brazil's rainforests.

The book is currently under development as a film and has been translated into Brazilian Portuguese. All royalties from Jabujicaba support conservation projects in Brazil's rainforests.

== Plot ==
Jabujicaba is set in Brazil in the not-too-distant future. The country is on the verge of bankruptcy and the populist and ‘green’ president is forced to auction off the Amazon rainforest to meet the country's debt obligations and to prevent a military coup.

The heroine is a young Black woman, Carmen Macedo. She is a journalist from London who was born in Brazil, having been adopted and moved to England after her mother's tragic suicide. When Carmen is sent by her paper to investigate an environmental disaster in the Amazon, her investigation turns into a mission to save the country of her birth. She finds herself having to confront her childhood traumas and rediscover the Brazilian ‘self’ she had lost.

In her mission, Carmen joins forces with an unlikely crew of people whom she suspects belong to the secretive Forest Liberation Front. She is increasingly attracted to their leader, a mysterious adventurer whom she knows as Braga. Together they journey through the apocalyptic cities of Brazil into the deepest Amazon forest, where they are captured by ‘savage’ Indians whose culture has been destroyed by the eco-disaster. Carmen also meets two of her dead mother's former lovers. Together they try to make sense of her mother's suicide as they discover it is connected to a legendary tree called Jabujicaba.

== Characters ==
- Carmen, a journalist from London for the Independent Times, born in Rio and adopted daughter of:
- Glória Beatrix Macedo (deceased), a photographer, herbalist and free spirit.
- Sesa da Souza, Carmen's nanny and maid to Glória. Lives in the adobe hut in the bottom of the garden with her husband.
- Antônio da Souza (deceased), gardener to Glória and Hannah.
- Lara Nussbaum, Carmen's adoptive sister and wife of Marco the president. Daughter of:
- Hannah Nussbaum (deceased), radical lawyer and environmental activist, daughter of:
- Esther Nussbaum (deceased), known as Grandma Esther who adopts Lara and Carmen on their mothers’ deaths and takes them to live with her in London.
- Marco Trani, the president of Brazil, lawyer and environmentalist, husband of Lara and son of:
- Roberto Trani, former green congressman and lifelong president of the environmental foundation Foresta SOS which was founded by:
- Sérgio da Silva (deceased), Brazil's richest man.
- Braga, adventurer from Rio who lives on a boat in the Great Green City (formerly known as Manaus).

== Main theme ==
Jabujicaba is allegorical. Human society, not just Brazil, is on a path to destruction. It is not just the Amazon forest that is being destroyed, but our own future. The Jabujicaba Tree represents life and continuity, societal and personal happiness. For these to exist, we need to challenge our economic and legal paradigms of ownership. We need a system change, for which all of us must socially and politically engage before it is too late. In Jabujicaba the people of the world literally take to the streets to put right the mistakes of the past and ensure that better future for themselves and generations to come.

== Inspiration ==
The author of Jabujicaba has a diverse professional background, which includes working in Brazil and for a green politician. Over her many years of experience with policy makers, scientists, businessmen, financial institutions and campaigning organisations, she became fed up with the negativity of messages, the endless news of extinctions and habitat destruction, the fragmentation of scientific debates and the division of stakeholders into adversarial camps. She felt the time had come for environmental re-engagement from the heart, for new role models to inspire the young to action with positive thinking – all of which can happen through literature and art.

Many other stakeholders are playing an important role in supporting the promotion of Jabujicaba and in exploring and reaching out with its ethical, economic and political arguments.

== Publication ==
Jabujicaba was first published as a free download for a month, to design and build the campaign. It was downloaded over 700 times globally. In April 2014, it was published as an e-book for Amazon Kindle, initially topping the best-seller lists in two categories and hovering around the top twenty for the months that followed.

The book was published as a paperback in May, with a campaign surrounding the World Cup 2014 in Brazil. It is sold and distributed by Blackwell's, one of the UK's oldest and most prestigious booksellers.

== Reception ==
Jabujicaba has had positive critical reviews from readers; on account of its wide stakeholder support and reviews, the Royal Society of Literature has accepted Jabujicaba for entry to its Ondaatje Prize, which is normally also reserved for only traditionally published books.

== Stakeholders ==
- The World Land Trust, international conservation charity, which is being supported through sales of Jabujicaba the book.
- REGUA, Brazilian conservation organisation, which is being supported through sales of Jabujicaba the book.
- Durrell Wildlife Conservation Trust, which is being supported through sales of Jabujicaba the book.
- Isle of Wight zoo, which is being supported through sales of Jabujicaba the book and Charlotte Corney, manager of the Isle of Wight zoo, who collaborated on the promotion of Jabujicaba through an in-depth interview on the thematic content.
- Uncharted Amazon, an expedition to film an Amazonian wildlife documentary, which is being supported through Voices for Nature Ltd.
- Chris Towler, entrepreneur with a pharmaceutical industries background, who collaborated on the promotion of Jabujicaba through an in-depth interview on the thematic content
- Eton College, which is hosting the first of the Jabujicaba debates.
- Burnham Grammar School, which is taking part in the first of the Jabujicaba debates.
- Peter Rivière, panelist for the Jabujicaba debates, Emeritus Professor of Oxford University, pioneer in study and teaching of Amazonian peoples. Member of 1957-8 Oxford and Cambridge Expedition to South America.
- Elizabeth Rahman, panelist for the Jabujicaba debates, social and medical anthropologist, Institute of Social and Cultural Anthropology, University of Oxford. Doctoral research carried out in North West Amazon.
- Tristan Thompson, panelist for the Jabujicaba debates, biologist, documentary filmmaker and leader of the Kickstarter-funded Amazonian expedition to the Amazon 2014/5
- Rupert Read of the UK's Green Party, who collaborated on the promotion of Jabujicaba through an in-depth interview on the thematic content.
- James Cameron, who was barrister of counsel to the global law firm Baker & McKenzie and collaborated on the promotion of Jabujicaba through an in-depth interview on the thematic content.
- Oxford United F.C., which supported Jabujicaba campaign by taking part in the Jabuji Charity Challenge during the World Cup in Brazil.
- She Kicks magazine, who were media partners for the Jabuji Charity Challenge during the World Cup in Brazil.
