= Transformative Experience =

2014 book by L. A. Paul

- Author: L. A. Paul
- Language: English
- Genre: Nonfiction philosophy
- Publisher: Oxford University Press
- Publication date: 2014
- Publication place: United States
- Media type: Print (Hardcover)
- Pages: 189
- ISBN: 9780198717959

Transformative Experience is a 2014 book by philosopher L. A. Paul. The book analyzes decision-making in circumstances where one of the possible options offers a radically new experience that cannot be assessed in advance, such as deciding to become a parent, or choosing to alter one's physical or mental capabilities. Transformative Experience was covered in numerous popular and academic outlets, including The New York Times, The Times Literary Supplement, Commonweal, Mind, Dialogue, and the Australasian Journal of Philosophy.

== Summary ==
Rational choice models of decision-making suggest gathering information on options and then proceeding with the option that best fits a person's current preferences and values. Paul argues that such a decision-making process is not possible for some options, called "transformative experiences", because the experience fundamentally transforms the person experiencing it. Paul offers a hypothetical example of a decision to become a vampire. Because a person would be fundamentally transformed by becoming a vampire, they cannot possibly know in advance what being a vampire is like. Other vampires might offer information, but their advice is likely shaped by their own irreversible choice. In this situation, a fully informed comparison of preferences and values is impossible.

Paul argues that several major life choices, such as having a child, converting to a religion, or medically altering one's physical and mental capacities, are transformative experiences that are structurally similar to becoming a vampire. A transformative experience changes the values and preferences held before making the decision. Making a choice therefore requires either relying on current preferences that may be incompatible with preferences developed after a transformative experience, or relying on possibly biased or unreliable input from others about their transformative experiences. As neither of these options is consistent with a first-person preference-based rational decision-making model, making a rational decision about transformative experiences requires thinking about the decision-making process differently. Rather than focusing on a specific personal outcome, Paul suggests instead considering the value of "revelation" by weighing the value of becoming a different person against the value of remaining the same person.

== Background ==
An earlier version of the argument in Transformative Experience appeared in the working paper "What You Can't Expect When You're Expecting", which examined the failure of rational choice when deciding whether or not to have a child. The paper was later accepted at Res Philosophica, but the unpublished draft was widely discussed on philosophy blogs, including the group blog Crooked Timber. Writing in Psychology Today, Tania Lombrozo found the paper's argument against empirical decision-making unpersuasive, but acknowledged that people who become parents are more likely than childless people to value parenthood.

== Reception ==
Transformative Experience received attention from popular and academic media. Writing in The New York Times, columnist David Brooks praised Paul's "ingenious" description of the problem and repeated the book's opening example of becoming a vampire, but objected to Paul's focus on "revelation" as too focused on personal desires rather than moral improvement. Amia Srinivasan's review in The Times Literary Supplement proposed that the main issue raised in the book was "not about the rationality of decision-making, but about the ethics of making decisions rationally". In The Stone, Paul Bloom suggested that Paul's argument should be extended to include how people imagine others, not just their future selves. John Schwenkler, in a review for Commonweal, praised the book for its persuasive argument but also suggested that coming to trust another person's opinion about a transformative experience might itself be a form of transformative experience. By the end of 2015 Cass Sunstein had named Transformative Experience in his Bloomberg essay on the "best books of 2015 on human bias and blunders".

Academic reviews offered several criticisms of the book but also acknowledged its influence on the field of philosophy. In a review in Mind, Richard Pettigrew criticized Paul's statement of the problem of deciding to become a parent, noting that the book did not consider how a person might rationally assign subjective probabilities that are not highly certain yet support a rational choice, but he concluded that the book "has proved enormously influential, and rightly so". Krister Bykvist's review in Notre Dame Philosophical Reviews suggested that Paul's analysis did not account for partial aspects of transformative experience that can be compared to known experiences. In Dialogue Irena Cronin praised the framework provided in Transformative Experience, particularly its distinction between decision-making processes in high-stakes life choices and low-stakes decisions about, for example, whether or not to try eating an unusual fruit. Writing for the Australasian Journal of Philosophy at the end of 2015, Marcus Arvan observed that Transformative Experience "has already received well-deserved public and philosophical attention", summarizing the book as "one of the best kinds of philosophy books".
