= Niviaq Korneliussen =

Greenlandic writer

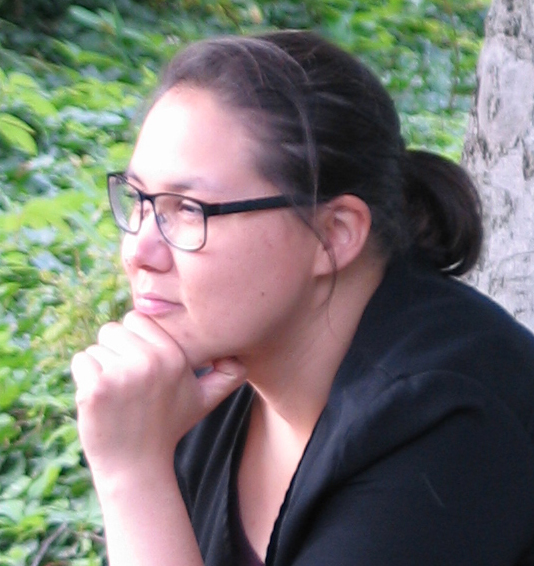
- Korneliussen in 2016
- Born: 27 January 1990 (age 36)
- Occupation: Novelist
- Writing career
- Language: Greenlandic, Danish
- Years active: 2013 – present
- Notable works: Homo Sapienne (2014); Naasuliardarpi (2020)
- Notable awards: Nordic Council Literature Prize (2021); Bjørnson Prize (2022)

Niviaq Korneliussen (born 27 January 1990) is a Greenlandic novelist and playwright who writes in Greenlandic and Danish. Her debut novel, Homo Sapienne (2014), follows five young people in Nuuk and explores sexuality, gender and Greenlandic identity. Her second novel, Blomsterdalen, published in Greenlandic as Naasuliardarpi (2020), addresses suicide, grief and belonging. It won the 2021 Nordic Council Literature Prize, making her the first Greenlandic author to receive the award.

Korneliussen's fiction uses multiple narrative voices, colloquial language and forms of digital communication, including text messages and social-media posts. Her work examines relationships and social expectations in contemporary Greenland.

Korneliussen has mentored young writers, helped establish a travelling writing school, and campaigned for suicide prevention and greater support for young people in Greenland. She received the Bjørnson Prize in 2022 for her literary work and social engagement.

== Personal life ==
Korneliussen was born on 27 January 1990 in southern Greenland, and grew up in Nanortalik. She was the second of three sisters; her father worked in education, and her mother worked in judicial administration. As a teenager, Korneliussen visited the United States through a school exchange programme. She began writing while at school and later described it as a way to explore possibilities beyond her immediate surroundings. In her late teens she came out as a lesbian; she said that her family were accepting of her sexuality.

She studied social sciences at the University of Greenland, pausing her studies in 2012, when she also began working with artists' associations in Nuuk. In August 2014, she moved to Denmark to study psychology at Aarhus University, leaving the course in 2015. In a 2019 interview, she explained that she had left her psychology studies to have enough time for readings, festivals and other commitments related to her writing career. After living in Denmark, she returned to Greenland and was living in Nuuk as of 2018.

As of 2026, Korneliussen was living in Nuuk with her partner, Nina Kreutzmann Jørgensen, and their son.

== Writing career ==
=== Short story and Homo sapienne ===
In 2012, Korneliussen entered the Allatta! short-story competition for young Greenlandic writers and was selected as one of its ten winners to have their work published in the project's 2013 anthology. Her story, "San Francisco", appeared in Greenlandic in 2013, with Danish and English translations following in 2015 and 2017 respectively. As part of the programme, she attended a writing workshop in Kangerlussuaq and travelled to Denmark, Finland and Sweden, including a visit to the Gothenburg Book Fair. She also worked with Danish writer Mette Moestrup as a mentor. Milik Publishing publisher Lene Therkildsen encouraged her to apply for a government grant to write her first novel. She received a three-month grant and wrote the manuscript during its final month, after putting it off for the first two months.

Her debut novel, Homo Sapienne, appeared in Greenlandic and in her own Danish version through Milik Publishing in 2014. It is divided into five sections narrated by young people in Nuuk, whose overlapping accounts concern relationships, sexual and gender identities, and their place in Greenlandic society. Korneliussen said that she wanted to write contemporary fiction in which young Greenlanders could recognise their own lives, rather than concentrating on traditional hunting culture or the landscape. She also said that, apart from a documentary book of interviews, she had found little treatment of homosexuality in Greenlandic literature. The book was nominated for the Nordic Council Literature Prize and the Politiken Literature Prize in 2015.

A French translation was published by La Peuplade in Canada in 2017 and released in France the following year. An English translation from the Danish version was published as Crimson in the United Kingdom in 2018 and as Last Night in Nuuk in the United States in 2019.

Literary scholar Kirsten Thisted described that a character's rewriting of Greenland's national anthem provoked outrage when circulated outside the novel's context. Reviewing the Danish edition in Berlingske, Jeppe Krogsgaard Christensen praised the novel's structure and handling of its narrators but criticised aspects of its English-language expressions and youthful tone. In the Los Angeles Review of Books, Katharine Coldiron found the English edition's characterisation and narrative techniques immature, while identifying promise in the writing and praising its understated portrayal of Greenlandic life. Ruby Brunton, writing in Bomb, acknowledged unevenness in the narrative but praised the emotional force of its depiction of young people and trauma. Noelle McManus's review in The Women's Review of Books praised its realism and portrayal of queer lives, although she felt that its colloquial narration sometimes rambled.

=== Angutivik and Naasuliardarpi ===
In 2016, Korneliussen contributed to Nina Kreutzmann Jørgensen's short-story collection Avannersumut sassarpoq, published in Danish as Hun står i nordenvind.

Korneliussen wrote the play Angutivik, known in Danish as Den grønlandske mand (The Greenlandic Man), which premiered in Nuuk on 8 September 2017. Directed by Hanne Trap Friis, the production was a collaboration between Greenland's National Theatre and Teater freezeProductions, drawing on interviews, workshops and meetings with Greenlandic men in Greenland and Denmark. It explored men's identities, relationships and experiences through monologues, music and movement, and a Danish-language version toured Denmark in 2018. Reviewing the Danish production in Aarhus Stiftstidende, Kirsten Dahl awarded it six stars out of six, praising the performances and its avoidance of clichés. Theatre scholar Annelis Kuhlmann subsequently emphasised the production's compassionate, documentary-like testimony, while finding its aesthetic qualities less compelling. It received a less positive response from Greenlandic reviewer Hans Peder Kirkegaard, who questioned its emphasis on social problems and the effectiveness of its monologues, while praising the actors.

Her second novel was published in August 2020 as Naasuliardarpi by Milik Publishing and as Blomsterdalen by Gyldendal. She wrote it in Danish before translating it into Greenlandic. The novel follows an unnamed young Greenlandic woman who moves to Aarhus to study and experiences alienation, racism and difficulties in her relationships. Her narrative alternates with accounts of deaths by suicide, arranged as a countdown from 45, the number of suicides recorded in Greenland in 2019.

In a 2019 interview, she described researching suicide for the book and considering how to write about it without disregarding the experiences of those affected. She later recalled that other paid work and the pressure of expectations after her debut had delayed her second novel. She said that a writing workshop with young people in Tasiilaq, and her concern about their access to support, led her to choose the novel's subject.

In Le Monde, Zoé Courtois praised the novel's formal inventiveness, describing how these initially brief notices expand and increasingly interrupt the main narrative. Literary scholar Pernille Meyer analyses its countdown, representations of death and changes in pronouns as ways of exploring the social problem through fiction. On 2 November 2021, Korneliussen received the Nordic Council Literature Prize for the novel, becoming the first Greenlandic author to win the prize. The prize jury mentioned its portrayal of love, friendship and life in a postcolonial society.

=== Style and themes ===
Korneliussen's fiction combines Greenlandic settings with references to international popular culture and digital communication such as text messages and social-media posts. Homo sapienne incorporates Danish and English into its Greenlandic text, while the Danish version retains Greenlandic words. Korneliussen has described this mixture of languages as part of young Greenlanders' everyday lives.

Thisted argued that Homo sapienne challenges both established gender roles and conventions of Greenlandic literary language through its use of everyday speech, code-switching and text messages. The language scholars Kristin Lorentsen and Jakob Stougaard-Nielsen suggested that the novel's self-translation and its use of several languages reflect identities that extend beyond one nation. They group Korneliussen and Sørine Steenholdt with a generation of writers who both critique Greenland and engage with the world beyond it. Agata Lubowicka, another scholar of literature, argued that Homo sapienne challenges traditional views of Greenlandic identity, nationhood, and postcolonialism, with Korneliussen presenting identity as being inclusive, diverse, and fluid.

The literary scholar Rozemarijn Vervoort argued that the novel's focus on tensions within Greenlandic identity helps establish a more independent position for Greenlandic literature within the Nordic literary field.

Korneliussen has said that she does not want to be seen as a representative of Greenland, its young people or a political cause. In interviews, she has described her ambition to question both the Danish stereotypes of Greenlanders, and attitudes within Greenlandic society.

== Activism and recognition ==
Korneliussen related her concern about suicide and the availability of support for young people, to her mentoring of young Greenlandic writers and her establishment of a travelling writing school offering workshops for young people. In October 2018, she launched the initiative Imminornerit 0 Selvmord ("Zero suicides"), working with volunteers in ten towns to prepare demonstrations calling for action on suicide prevention. The initiative called for immediate professional help for people at risk and bereaved families, increased resources and action by members of Inatsisartut.

In 2020, Korneliussen and Apannguaq Lynge Tellesen were the two recipients of the children's rights organisation MIO's prize for work promoting children's rights and improving their living conditions. She received a three-year working grant from the Danish Arts Foundation in 2021. In 2022, she was awarded the Bjørnson Prize for her literary work and social engagement. That June, Greenland's culture minister Peter Olsen presented her with a cultural prize from Naalakkersuisut.

In her acceptance speech for the 2021 Nordic Council Literature Prize, she addressed her remarks to Greenlandic children and young people rather than the country's political leaders, whom she criticised for not listening. The communication scholar Sine N. Just saw the speech as encouraging shared mourning, acknowledging young people and affirming their ability to act.

In 2026, Korneliussen created the podcast series Inuuneq Annernaraangat ("When life hurts"), broadcast by KNR. The series has accounts of bereavement, with contributions from researchers and mental-health professionals, and discusses access to support.

== Works ==
=== Short stories ===
- "San Francisco"
  - published in Inuusuttut – nunatsinni nunarsiarmilu (2013). ISBN 978-87-92790-18-7
  - published in Ung i Grønland – ung i verden (2015). ISBN 978-87-92790-43-9

=== Novels ===
- HOMO sapienne (2014). ISBN 978-87-92790-44-6
  - translated into Danish by the author as HOMO sapienne (2014). ISBN 978-87-92790-65-1
  - translated into German by Giannina Spinty-Mossin and Katja Langmaier as Nuuk #ohne Filter (2016) ISBN 978-3-902902-47-4
  - translated into English (Great Britain) by Anna Halager as Crimson (2018). ISBN 978-0-349-01056-4
  - translated into French by Inès Jorgensen as Homo sapienne (2017). ISBN 978-2-924519-58-5
  - translated into Icelandic by Heiðrún Ólafsdóttir as HOMO sapína (2018). ISBN 978-9935-465-92-4
  - translated into Swedish by Jonas Rasmussen as Homo Sapienne (2018). ISBN 978-91-7343-752-3
  - translated into English (USA) by Anna Halager as Last night in Nuuk (2019). ISBN 978-0-8021-4674-8
  - translated into Norwegian by Kim Leine as HOMO sapienne (2019). ISBN 978-82-02-57245-7
  - translated into Romanian by Simina Răchițeanu as HOMO sapienne (2020). ISBN 978-973-47-3296-8
  - translated into Polish by Agata Lubowicka as HOMO sapienne (2021). ISBN 978-83-953485-6-3
  - translated into Italian by Francesca Turri as Una notte a Nuuk (2025). ISBN 978-88-7091-700-0
- Blomsterdalen (2020), written in Danish. ISBN 978-87-02-27838-5
  - translated into Greenlandic by the author as Naasuliardarpi (2020). ISBN 978-87-93941-15-1
  - translated into Norwegian by Kyrre Andreassen as Blomsterdalen (2021). ISBN 978-82-05-54809-1
  - translated into Faroese by Vagnur Streymoy as Blómudalurin (2022). ISBN 978-99972-1-462-1
  - translated into Polish by Agata Lubowicka as Dolina Kwiatów (2022). ISBN 978-83-8191-546-5
  - translated into French by Inès Jorgensen as La vallée des fleurs (2022). ISBN 978-2-925141-10-5
  - translated into Italian by Francesca Turri as La valle dei fiori (2023). ISBN 978-88-7091-670-6
  - translated into Swedish by Johanne Lykke Naderehvandi as Blomsterdalen (2023). ISBN 978-91-1-312317-2
  - translated into Icelandic by Heiðrún Ólafsdóttir as Blómadalur (2023). ISBN 9789935521538
  - translated into German by Franziska Hüther as Das Tal der Blumen (2023). ISBN 978-3-442-76239-2
  - translated into North Sámi by Kari Utsi as Lieđđevággi (2024). ISBN 978-82-329-0582-9
  - translated into Spanish by Blanca Ortiz Ostalé as El Valle de las Flores (2025). ISBN 978-84-10249-36-3
  - translated into Catalan by Maria Rosich as La vall de les Flors (2025). ISBN 978-84-19332-89-9

=== Plays ===
- Angutivik (2017; Greenlandic) / Den grønlandske mand (2018; Danish)
