= Friday Barnes: Girl Detective =

Australian children's novel by R. A. Spratt

- First edition
- Author: R. A. Spratt
- Cover artist: Lilly Piri
- Language: English
- Genre: Children's novel
- Published: 2014 (Random House Australia)
- Publication place: Australia
- Media type: Print (paperback)
- Pages: 248
- ISBN: 9781742759623
- OCLC: 969822948
- Followed by: Friday Barnes, Under Suspicion

Friday Barnes, Girl Detective is a 2014 Children's novel by R. A. Spratt. It is about an 11-year-old girl, Friday, who uses her detecting skills to solve mysteries at her boarding school.

== Publication history ==
- 2014, Australia, Random House Australia ISBN 9781742759623
- 2016, Phil Grosier (illus.), 272p. USA, Roaring Brook Press ISBN 9781626722972

== Reception ==
A review in Kirkus Reviews of Friday Barnes wrote "Spratt begins this new series with a nifty, engaging protagonist who can keep readers laughing and help young geeks feel good about themselves.", and complimented Gosier's illustrations, while Reading Time was somewhat critical of the apparent contradiction between its young reader format and older reader language.

Common Sense Media and Booklist (that gave a star review) were both complimentary.

Friday Barnes has also been reviewed by Publishers Weekly (star review), BookPage, The Bulletin of the Center for Children's Books, Australian Literacy Educators' Association, School Library Journal, Horn Book Guide Reviews, and School Library Connection.

Entertainment Weekly in its 2016 list of best middle-grade books gave Friday Barnes an honorable mention.
