= Lucy Mangan =

British columnist (born 1974)

- Born: 1974 (age 51–52)
- Education: Trinity Hall, Cambridge
- Occupations: Writer; television critic
- Employer: The Guardian
- Children: 1
- Website: theguardian.com/profile/lucymangan

Lucy Mangan (born 1974) is a British journalist and author. She is a columnist, features writer and TV critic for The Guardian and an opinion writer for The i Paper.

== Early life and education ==
Lucy Mangan was born in 1974 and grew up in Catford, south-east London, to parents originally from Lancashire. Her father worked in theatre, and her mother was a doctor.

She studied English at Trinity Hall, Cambridge and qualified as a solicitor, but worked in a bookshop until she found a work experience placement at The Guardian in 2003.

== Career ==
=== Journalism ===
Mangan writes a regular column, TV reviews, and occasional features at The Guardian, and as of July 2026 is an opinion writer for The i Paper. A major part of her writing is related to feminism.

As of November 2025, The Guardian had given only 18 zero-star reviews, three of which were by Mangan. In 2021 Mangan gave a zero-star review to the film Sex, Unzipped, remarking that the film "is a TV disgrace". In 2025 Mangan gave a zero-star review to the TV series All's Fair, describing the show as "Fascinatingly, incomprehensibly, existentially terrible".

Mangan previously had a regular column for Stylist magazine, with her last column being published in 2020.

=== Books ===
Mangan's book My Family and other Disasters (2009) is a collection of her newspaper columns. She has also written books about her childhood and her wedding.

Her debut novel, Are We Having Fun Yet?, was published in 2021. The Scotsman's Kirsty McLuckie gave the novel a positive review, describing the book as "a work of genius".

== Other activities ==
Mangan has been a judge for the BookTrust Roald Dahl Funny Prize.

== Recognition and awards ==
Mangan won the columnist of the year award at the Professional Publishers Association Awards in 2013, and was shortlisted for the critic of the year award at The British Press Awards in 2019.

== Criticism ==
Mangan's review of Sex Education series four on The Guardian received criticism for perceived transphobia. Following the backlash, the publication edited a sentence in the piece.

== Personal life ==
Mangan and her husband have a son.

== Works ==
- My Family and other Disasters, Hachette (2010) ISBN 0852653689
- The Reluctant Bride: One Woman's Journey (Kicking and Screaming) Down the Aisle, Guardian Books (2012) ISBN 184854359X
- Hopscotch & Handbags: The Truth about Being a Girl, Headline (2013) ISBN 9780755316489
- Inside Charlie's Chocolate Factory, Puffin UK/US (2014) ISBN 9780147513489
- Bookworm: A Memoir of Childhood Reading, Square Peg (2018) ISBN 9781784709228
- Are We Having Fun Yet?, Souvenir (2021)
- Bookish: How Reading Shapes Our Lives, Vintage Publishing (2025) ISBN 979-8897100446

== Sources ==
https://www.themarysue.com/imagine-feeling-the-need-to-be-transphobic-in-a-sex-education-review/
