= Diversity Explosion =

2014 book by William H. Frey

- First edition
- Author: William H. Frey
- Language: English
- Published: 2014
- Publisher: Brookings Press
- Publication place: United States
- Media type: Print

Diversity Explosion: How New Racial Demographics are Remaking America is a 2014 non-fiction book by William H. Frey.

A look into how racial and ethnic diversity and changing demographics are altering the United States, Diversity Explosion is published and distributed by the Brookings Institution Press.

Frey is a senior fellow at the Brookings Institution Metropolitan Policy Program.
