= Backroads Pragmatists =

2014 history book by Ruben Flores

- Author: Ruben Flores
- Subject: History of Mexico, history of the United States
- Published: 2014 (University of Pennsylvania Press)
- Pages: 360
- ISBN: 978-0-8122-4620-9

Backroads Pragmatists: Mexico's Melting Pot and Civil Rights in the United States is a history book by Ruben Flores about the connection between post-revolutionary Mexico and the American Civil Rights Movement. University of Pennsylvania Press published the book in 2014. It won the Society for U.S. Intellectual History Book Award the next year.
