= S. E. Lister =

- Born: 26 April 1988 (age 38)
- Education: Bachelor of Arts
- Alma mater: University of Warwick
- Occupation: Novelist
- Writing career
- Years active: 2014–present
- Genres: Historical fiction, mystery fiction, thriller

S. E. Lister (born 26 April 1988) is an English historical fiction author. In 2015 she was nominated for the Edinburgh First Book Award for her debut novel Hideous Creatures.

== Life and career ==
S. E. Lister was born on 26 April 1988, and grew up in Newent, Gloucestershire. In 2006 she began a Creative Writing course at the University of Warwick.

== Reviews ==
In May 2014, Lister released her debut novel, Hideous Creatures, through Old Street Publishing. Jane Housham of The Guardian gave the book a positive review, describing it as "a gothic road novel" and saying that its pace was "well-handled throughout". Author Maxim Jakubowski also praised the novel, saying that "[it] grips and enchants and you never want it to end". Marcus Sedgwick commended the book as "what all the best fiction should be; something rich and strange". In 2015 Lister received a nomination for Hideous Creatures for that year's Edinburgh First Book Award – the prize ultimately went to Colin MacIntyre for The Letters of Ivor Punch.

Lister's follow-up to Hideous Creatures, The Immortals, appeared in September 2015, again from Old Street. David Duff of We Love This Book reviewed described the story as "extraordinary" and the characters as "fascinating". He remarked: "S. E. Lister has done a commendable job of turning a well-trodden concept into something quite new." Isabella Silvers of InStyle recommended the book as one of six to read that summer, saying that she was "gripped" by it. Jakubowski again praised Lister, saying that The Immortals was "truly the stuff of dreams".

A mixed review came from Rebecca Monks of The List, who awarded the book three points out of five. Monks praised the "fast-paced plot... strong characters and witty, energetic dialogue", and felt that Lister's style was "charming", but criticised the novel's premise as "familiar". Jane Jakeman of The Independent similarly felt that about the book's evocations of "lush", but that "Lister takes us whirling through time so fast that nothing makes any great impression".

== Awards and accolades ==
Year	Award	Details	Result	Ref.
2015	Edinburgh First Book Award	Hideous Creatures	Nominated	
