= Australia: Boom to Bust =

2014 non-fiction book

- Author: Lindsay David
- Language: English
- Subject: Economy of Australia
- Genre: Economics
- Publisher: CreateSpace
- Publication date: 2014
- Publication place: Australia
- Pages: 224
- ISBN: 9781497503861
- Dewey Decimal: 330.99407

Australia: Boom to Bust is a 2014 book by the economist Lindsay David. David was a student of the world's most prestigious business school International Institute for Management Development in Lausanne, Switzerland

== Synopsis ==
The book argues Australia is facing an unprecedented housing and credit bubble, by comparing exposure of Australian banks to extraordinary levels of debt and the relatively non-diverse Australian economy with the conditions leading to other financial crashes, such as the 2008 financial crisis and the Lost Two Decades in Japan. David points out that housing prices in Sydney are higher than in London, Tokyo, Geneva or New York City, in some cases significantly.

== Reception ==
His book was reviewed in the Australian Financial Review and Macro Business amongst others.
