= Homo Sapienne =

2014 Greenlandic novel

First edition

Homo Sapienne, stylized as HOMO sapienne, and also known as Last Night in Nuuk or Crimson, from its English translations, is a novel by Greenlander Niviaq Korneliussen, published in 2014 in both Greenlandic and Danish. After winning a short story competition, Korneliussen was financially supported by the Greenland government to write the novel over three months, but she wrote it in only one. It is about the lives of several LGBT characters in Nuuk, the capital of Greenland. While reviewers commended its subject matter, the novel had issues with pacing and tone; it received a mixed critical reception. Regardless, it was nominated for the 2015 Nordic Council Literature Prize. Korneliussen would later go on to win the prize in 2021 with her follow-up, Naasuliardarpi (Flower Valley).

== Background ==
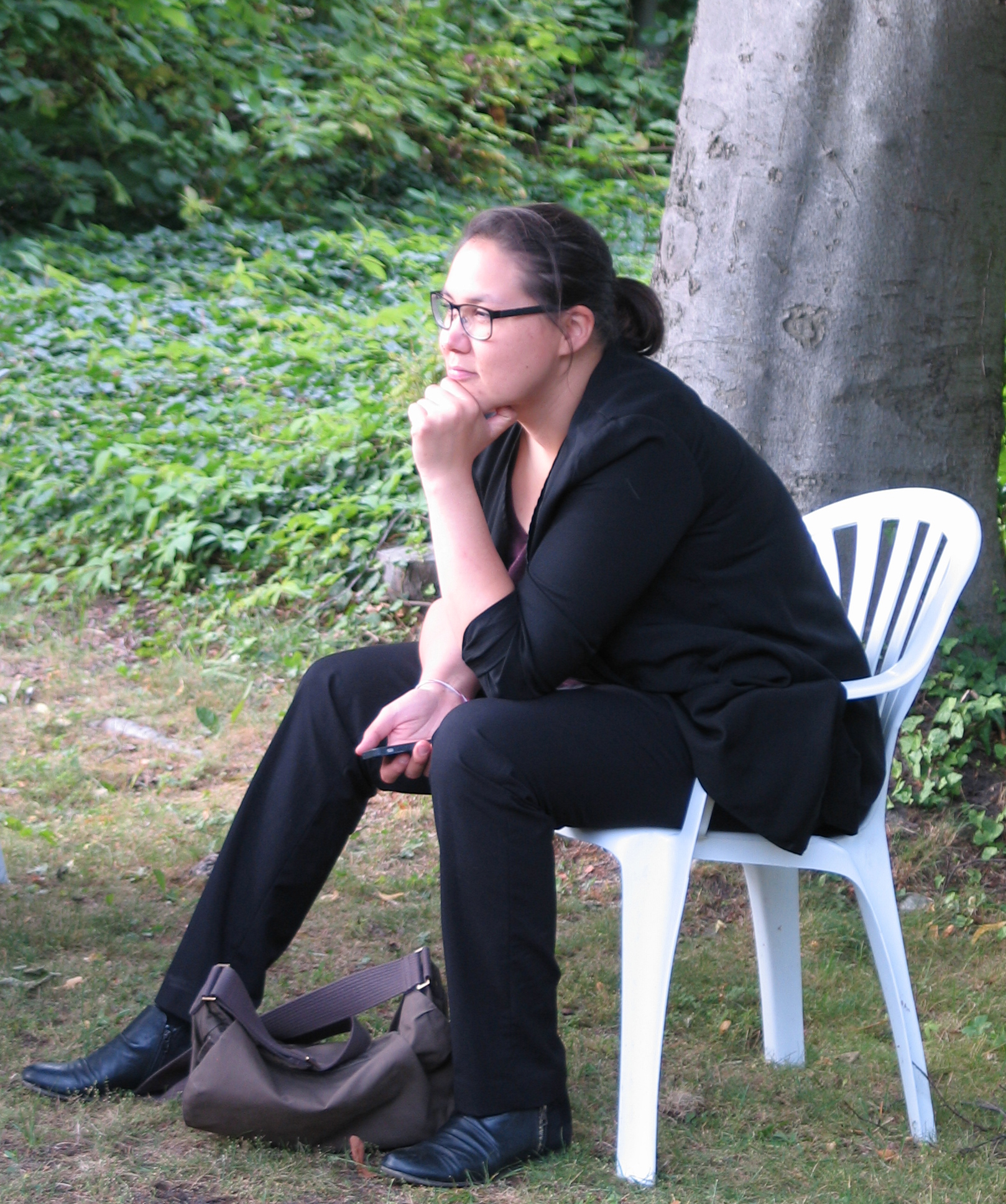
Korneliussen in 2016

Niviaq Korneliussen is a Greenlandic writer who grew up in Nanortalik, a village in the south of the island. She entered a short story competition held in Greenland for young writers in 2012, submitting a piece called "San Francisco". She won the competition, and was then asked for a novel by the publisher. She received financial support for three months from the Greenlandic government to write the novel, but she wrote it all in only the final month. Homo Sapienne (stylized as HOMO sapienne) was published in 2014 in the Greenlandic language, with one chapter in English. It was translated into Danish by Korneliussen, and separately into English (as Crimson and Last Night in Nuuk) and German.

While most Greenlandic literature is traditionally focused on its geography and its modest living conditions, Korneliussen's novel is instead written in a stream of consciousness, occupied with the interior lives of its characters. The culture of the island is rather inflexible, resulting in Korneliussen drawing upon pop culture in the English language rather than in Greenlandic. The book documents LGBT life in Nuuk, the capital of Greenland. Characters in the novel include Arnaq, Fia, Inuk, Ivik, and Sara, all of whom are of undisclosed ages but perhaps in their twenties. Fia was also the name of a character in "San Francisco". Since Nuuk is a small town of some 17,000 people without an established gay subculture, the novel is set mostly in bars and in homes.

Events for the novel included a class reading in celebration of a theme day for the North Atlantic region, where pizza was served and songs in regional languages were sung.

== Plot ==
Fia

Fia, a young woman from Greenland, is in a relationship with Peter but feels unhappy and constrained by the conventional nature of their relationship. Her internal conflict intensifies as she realizes she is not in love with Peter but is instead attracted to women, a realization that challenges societal norms in Greenland. After ending her relationship with Peter, Fia begins to explore her queer identity amidst fears of societal judgment and personal uncertainty. At a party hosted by her flatmate Arnaq, Fia meets a woman named Sara, to whom she is attracted to. Struggling with denial, she has sex with a man but finds it unfulfilling, which reinforces her disinterest in men. Arnaq later confronts Fia about her attraction to women, leading to the two having sex. The following day, Fia reconnects with her brother, who invites her to another party where she meets Sara again. The two share a kiss, and Fia realizes she is in love with Sara.

Inuk

Inuk’s chapter begins with him reflecting on his time in prison, which he describes as a suffocating environment where he faces the threat of abuse and rape from fellow inmates. After escaping, he writes a letter to his sister, Fia, expressing his care for her and his desire to leave Greenland. In response, Fia writes to him, urging him to call her and expressing her unconditional love. Inuk encounters cruel online posts targeting queer individuals in Greenland, including rumors about a politician, Miki Lovstrom. He also writes letters to Arnaq, accusing her of ruining his life, and to Fia, denouncing queerness as evil. Fia replies, expressing sadness over Arnaq’s actions but reaffirming her love and understanding for her brother while coming out to him as gay. The siblings continue exchanging letters, with Inuk grappling with his internalized homophobia and frustration with his identity and societal expectations. In a moment of reconciliation, Inuk forgives Arnaq and writes to Fia, admitting he is gay and asking for her forgiveness. He concludes by telling her he loves and misses her, stating that he has finally found a sense of home.

Arnaq

Arnaq’s chapter begins with her waking up hungover and reflecting on the previous day’s events. She prepares for a party hosted by a man named Enevold and attends with her flatmate, Fia. At the party, she encounters her friend Inuk and discusses her attraction to a woman named Ivik, who is already in a relationship. It is revealed that Arnaq has been secretly texting Ivik. After Arnaq and Fia have a sexual encounter at the party, Fia becomes distant toward her. Later, Arnaq meets with Inuk and brings up the politician Miki Lovstrom, but Inuk quickly silences her. During their conversation, Arnaq shares details about her childhood trauma. Ivik arrives at the party, and in front of a group, Arnaq reveals information about Inuk’s relationship with Miki Lovstrom, receiving shocked reactions from the crowd, since he is married with children. The following day, Arnaq wakes up after a sexual encounter with Ivik and attempts to contact Inuk, who does not respond. She calls her parents to ask for money and texts Enevold about attending another party. The chapter concludes with Arnaq falling back into a pattern of heavy drinking and self-destructive behavior.

Iviq

As a child, Iviq recognized that she was different from other girls, experiencing attraction to girls instead of boys. This led to judgment and rejection by her family and friends, who eventually abandoned her. By the age of twenty-three, Iviq has found a sense of belonging among friends who accept her and in her relationship with her girlfriend, Sara. However, their intimacy becomes strained when Iviq repeatedly avoids sex, leading to emotional tension. When Sara asks for an explanation, Iviq reacts defensively, claiming not to have an answer. Iviq later speculates that she may have a medical condition, which Sara tries to understand. Despite Sara’s efforts, the situation remains unresolved, and they still cannot be intimate together. It is eventually revealed that Iviq had sex with Arnaq and asked her to keep it a secret. Sara discovers this by reading Iviq’s messages and ends their relationship. After weeks of Iviq pleading for reconciliation, Sara agrees to meet and expresses that while she is not attracted to men, she will remain Iviq’s friend. This conversation leads Iviq to the realization that he is transgender, marking a pivotal moment of self-awareness. He describes this realization as being "born again."

Sara

Sara’s chapter follows her journey of recovery and self-discovery after her breakup with Iviq. She visits the hospital in Nuuk to support her pregnant sister during childbirth. Although she assists by cutting the umbilical cord, Sara refuses to hold the baby, fearing her own polluted soul might taint the child’s purity. After leaving the hospital, she takes a taxi, during which the driver shares his life story. Initially irritated, Sara comes to understand his need to be heard and responds patiently. At home, Sara listens to American music and reflects on her breakup with Iviq, descending into depressive thoughts. The following day, she tries to create a happy atmosphere but struggles to escape her feelings. On Facebook, she sees a post from her sister about the baby and begins researching questions about infidelity and Iviq’s identity. Her sister asks for permission to name the baby Iviq, to which Sara agrees. This prompts a realization that Iviq is a man, allowing Sara to find closure and accept their breakup. She reflects on the importance of forgiveness, both in giving and receiving it, and shares with her sister that she has spoken with Iviq. Sara also confesses her longing for Fia but doubts whether a relationship with her is possible. She imagines moving to San Francisco with Fia, finding a sense of freedom and happiness in the idea. Later, at a party, Sara encounters Fia, who hands her a note confessing her love. Sara sings “Crimson and Clover” to her, and she realizes that she is in love with Fia. The chapter concludes with Sara expressing joy and fulfillment, describing it as "a day to be alive."

== Reception ==
Homo Sapienne had a mixed reception. While its themes of LGBT identity were accepted by its Greenlandic audience, the details of familial abuse were not. The novel was criticised as immature and Korneliussen as lacking experience by Katharine Coldiron of the Los Angeles Review of Books, since it contains unnecessary material (such as a dramatis personae—a list of characters), the characters have similar voices, shallowness, and details of pop culture. Hannah Jane Parkinson of The Guardian said the book was clumsy, and there were major discontinuities throughout, some within the space of a single "fag break". The tone was also criticised by a reviewer for the Women's Review of Books as too colloquial. Despite the criticism they levied, Coldiron and Parkinson both found positive attributes in the novel. Coldiron said some of the novel had thoughtful narration, and "subtly" portrayed Greenlandic life "without much politicizing", while Parkinson said some of the prose was lyrically written.

Scholar Rozemarijn Vervoort wrote that Korneliussen's novel made her a "pioneer for a new generation of young Greenlandic authors". Similarly, Coldiron suggested that Western literary presses take into account more writers like Korneliussen, who write in underrepresented regions.
