= Said the Gramophone =

Blog

- Website type: MP3 blog
- Available in: English
- Owner: Sean Michaels
- Website: www.saidthegramophone.com
- Commercial: No
- Launched: 2003
- Current status: Active

Said the Gramophone is an mp3 blog launched in 2003, one of the first of its type. Founded by Canadian novelist Sean Michaels, as of 2016 the site is maintained with contributions by poet Emma Healey, zine-maker Jeff Miller and Mitz Takahashi. Its past editors were Toronto-based actor Dan Beirne (2004 to 2014), and Jordan Himelfarb (2004 to 2012), who subsequently became an editor at the Toronto Star.

Said the Gramophone is strongly associated with Montreal's indie-rock scene. The site charted the rise of bands like Arcade Fire, Wolf Parade and Tune-Yards and has been credited with introducing them to a wider audience. It was also among the first outlets to write about Beirut, Nicolas Jaar, Basia Bulat, Yeasayer, Feist, and Clap Your Hands Say Yeah.

Besides its longevity, Said the Gramophone has been recognized for its "inventive, literary style" — using metaphor, anecdote and even short fiction to describe the way a song "feels" to the listener. It is also notable for the way it has never accepted advertising, subsisting on occasional funding drives from its readers. In 2009, Time Magazine selected Said the Gramophone as one of the 25 best blogs in the world.

Guest contributors to the blog have included Arcade Fire, Grizzly Bear, Beirut, Silver Jews, novelist Jonathan Lethem, and critics Sasha Frere-Jones and Carl Wilson, among many others.

In the final coda scene of the 2024 year-2000-set horror comedy film Y2K, Jaeden Martell's character, now in 2005, reveals that since the earlier events of the film he had moved to Brooklyn and started a music blog called "So Said the Turntable," a likely reference to Said the Gramophone.
