= L. A. Paul =

American philosopher (born 1966)

- Born: Laurie Ann Paul; November 10, 1966 (age 59)

Education
- Education: Antioch College; Princeton University
- Thesis: Essays on Causation (1999)
- Doctoral advisor: David Lewis

Philosophical work
- School: Analytic philosophy
- Institutions: Yale University; University of Arizona; Australian National University; University of North Carolina, Chapel Hill; University of St Andrews
- Main interests: Metaphysics; philosophy of mind; decision theory
- Notable ideas: Transformative experience

Laurie Ann Paul (born 1966) is an American philosopher who is a professor of philosophy and cognitive science at Yale University. She previously taught at the University of North Carolina at Chapel Hill and the University of Arizona. She is best known for her research on the counterfactual analysis of causation and the concept of "transformative experience."

== Biography and career ==
Born November 10, 1966, Paul graduated from Antioch College in Yellow Springs, Ohio, in 1990 with a BA in chemistry. Before going to graduate school, Paul corresponded with a number of philosophers about their work, including Nancy Cartwright and Lynne Rudder Baker. In 1999, Paul graduated from Princeton University with a PhD in philosophy, where she wrote a dissertation titled Essays on Causation under the supervision of David Lewis.

Paul taught at Yale University from 1999 to 2001, and at the University of Arizona from 2001 until 2008, before moving to North Carolina. She has also held appointments at the Australian National University and at the University of St. Andrews.

== Philosophical work ==
Paul's principal research interests are in metaphysics and the philosophy of mind. Her work focuses on causation, mereology, the philosophy of time, and related topics in phenomenology, the philosophy of science, and philosophy of language. Her work in ontology and mereology develops a distinctive view of objects as fusions of property instances. Her article "What You Can't Expect When You're Expecting" develops the notion of transformative experience and explores its consequences for the possibility of rational decision-making.

She is the editor of Causation and Counterfactuals, co-author of Causation: A User's Guide, and author of Transformative Experience.

== Awards ==
The Australian National University's Institute for Advanced Study Research awarded Paul a fellowship for the period 2001-06.

In 2011, Paul was awarded a fellowship from the National Humanities Center for her work. In 2014, Paul received a grant from the John Templeton Foundation to study religious and transformative experience, and a fellowship from the Guggenheim Foundation.

== Personal life ==
Paul has two children with Irish sociologist Kieran Healy, from whom she is divorced.

== Selected works ==
- Essays on Causation (PhD thesis). Princeton University. 1999.
- Paul, L.A. (2002). "Logical Parts" (PDF). Noûs. 36 (4): 578–596. doi:10.1111/1468-0068.00402.
- Paul, L. A. (2006). "Coincidence as Overlap" (PDF). Noûs. 40 (4): 623–659. doi:10.1111/j.1468-0068.2006.00627.x.
- "Temporal Experience" (PDF). The Journal of Philosophy. CVII (7): 333–359. July 2010.
- Hitchcock, Christopher; Menzies, Peter; Beebee, Helen, eds. (2012). "The Counterfactual Analysis of Causation -aka- Keeping track of the time: emending the counterfactual analysis of causation" (PDF). The Oxford Handbook on Causation. Oxford University Press. pp. 100–110. ISBN 9780199642588.
- Transformative Experience. Oxford University Press. 2014. p. 189. ISBN 9780198717959.
- Paul, L. A. (2015). "What You Can't Expect When You're Expecting" (PDF). Res Philosophica. 92 (2): 1–23. doi:10.11612/resphil.2015.92.2.1. S2CID 10739036.
