= William H. Frey =

American demographer and author

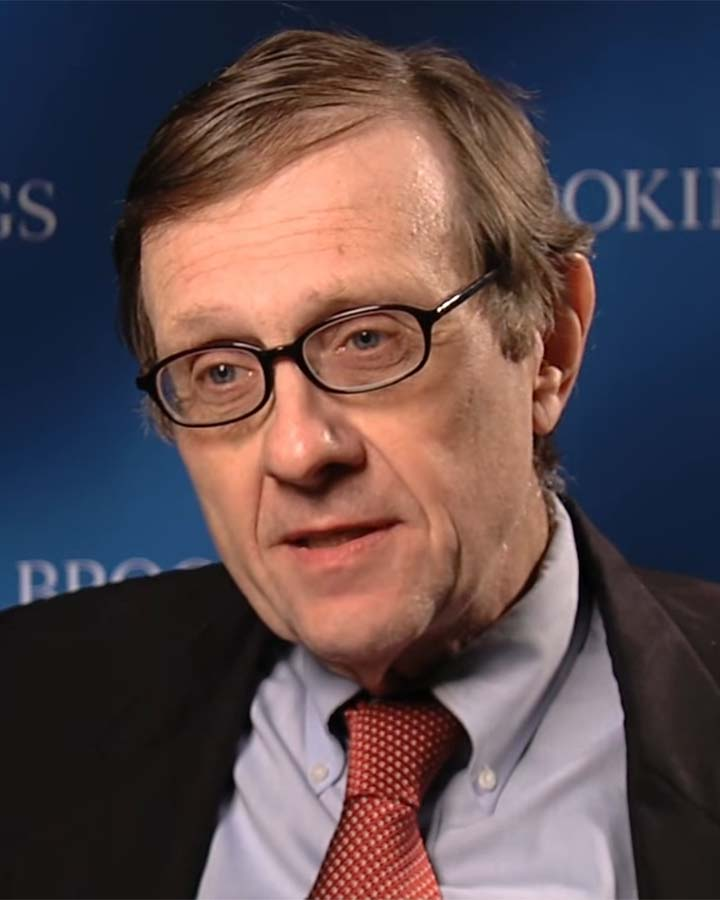
- Born: 1947 (age 78–79); United States
- Education: Ursinus College; Brown University
- Occupations: Demographer, author

William Henry Frey (born 1947) is an American demographer and author. He is currently a Senior Fellow with Brookings Metro at the Brookings Institution and a Research Professor at the University of Michigan's Population Studies Center. According to Michael Barone, "Frey is widely acknowledged as America’s leading demographer."

Frey graduated with a Bachelor of Science from Ursinus College in 1969 and a PhD in sociology from Brown University in 1974.

Frey is the author of multiple books including Diversity Explosion. His work has been covered by publications including Newsweek, The New York Times, NPR, the Claremont Institute and PBS.
