= There's This Thing =

2014 children's book by Connah Brecon

- Author: Connah Brecon
- Language: English
- Genre: Children's picture book
- Published: 2014 (Philomel Books)
- Publication place: Australia
- Media type: Print (hardback)
- Pages: 32 (unpaginated)
- ISBN: 9780399161858
- OCLC: 870919308

There's This Thing is a 2014 children's picture book by Connah Brecon about a shy girl trying to find love. It was first published by Philomel Books.

== Reception ==
A reviewer in The New York Times of There's This Thing wrote, "It’s a refreshing reminder that it can be hard to ask for what we want, and that even introverts need love above all.".

Kirkus Reviews called the book "a muddle," and Publishers Weekly wrote that "some readers may find the girl’s vaguely described longings tricky to parse."

There's This Thing has also been reviewed by School Library Journal, which suggested, "Shy children would be better served by Melanie Watts's Scaredy Squirrel Makes a Friend", and The Horn Book Magazine ("This sweet picture-book valentine with expressive and endearing digital illustrations has a subtlety of plot and theme that will elude most young children").
