= James Thompson (crime writer) =

American-Finnish crime writer (1964–2014)

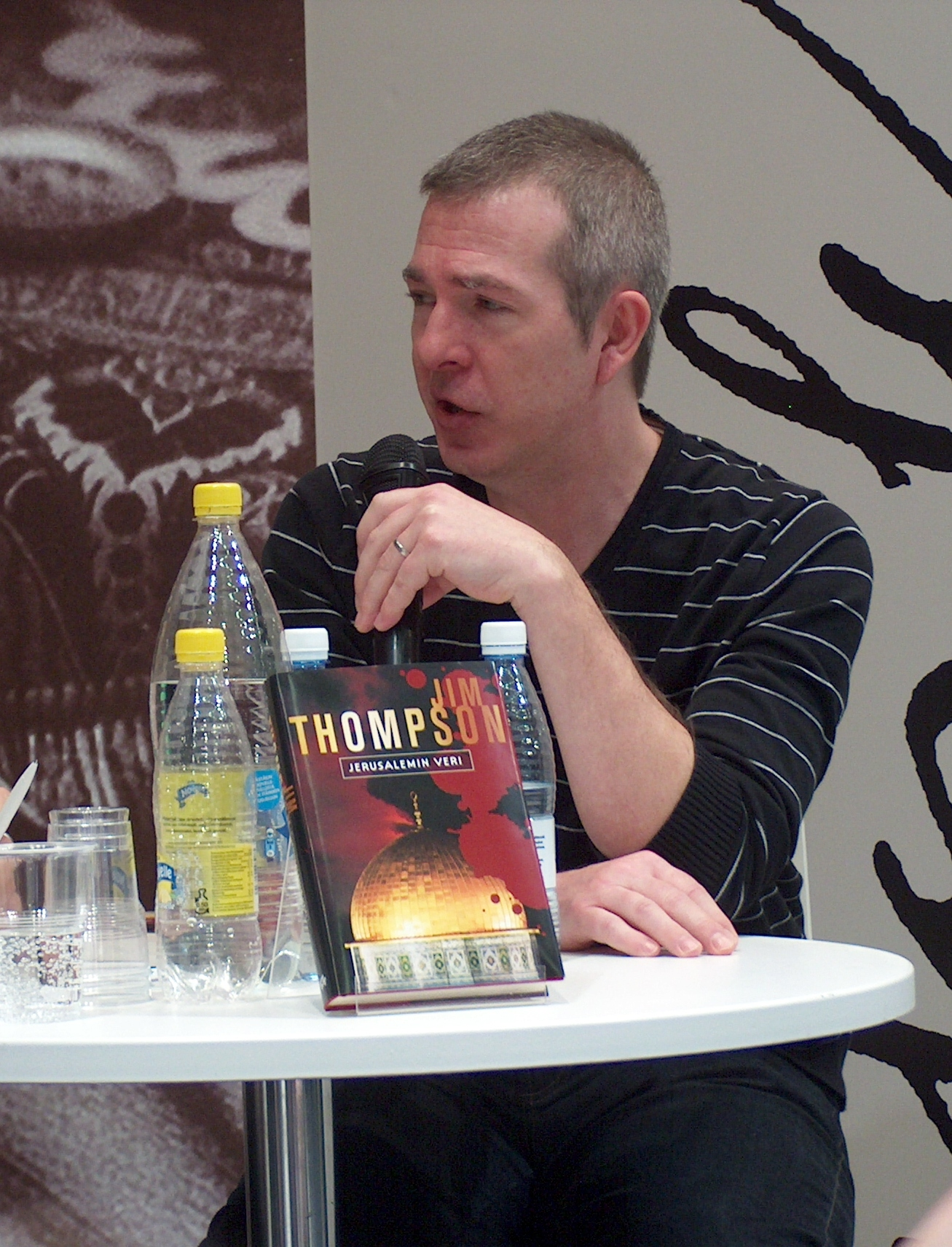
- James Thompson at the Helsinki Book Fair in 2008.
- Born: 16 October 1964; Kentucky, United States
- Died: 2 August 2014 (aged 49); Lahti, Finland
- Writing career
- Language: English, Finnish
- Genre: Crime fiction

James Thompson (16 October 1964 – 2 August 2014) was an American-Finnish crime writer based in Helsinki. He had a master's degree in English philology from The University of Helsinki, where he also studied Finnish, in which he was fluent. He studied six languages. He published four crime novels with the Finnish inspector Kari Vaara as the protagonist.

Helsinki Noir was published by Akashic Books November 2014. It is an anthology edited by Thompson and it includes one story he wrote.

Thompson died unexpectedly in his home town of Lahti, Finland in August 2014.

== Inspector Vaara series ==
Kari Vaara, police chief in the town of Kittilä, Lapland, debuted in Thompson's first novel, Snow Angels. In the second novel, Lucifer's Tears, he moves to Helsinki. While he is portrayed as a good cop in the first two books, in the next installment, Helsinki White, we see Vaara turning into a rogue and corrupt cop. Helsinki Blood takes on further along the same line, with Vaara trying to tie all loose ends and redeem himself.

== Bibliography ==
=== Inspector Vaara series ===
- Snow Angels (2009)
- Lucifer's Tears (2011)
- Helsinki White (2012)
- Helsinki Blood (2013)
- Helsinki Dead was scheduled for release in 2014 but remained unfinished at the time of Thompson's death.

=== Other literary endeavors ===
James Thompson was first reviewed and later became a reviewer at New York Journal of Books. Following his very early death, New York Journal of Books added to his reviewer biography, "James Thompson passed away in August 2014. The world of literature has lost a tremendous talent. And those at New York Journal of Books who came to know the person he was have lost a treasured friend who was blessed with talent and humanity in equal measure. He is and always will be greatly missed."

=== Books only published in Finnish ===
- Jerusalemin veri (2008)
- Jumalan nimeen (2010)

=== Other works ===
Thompson was also editor of the anthology Helsinki Noir (November 2014, ISBN 978-1617752414).
