= Sean Michaels (writer) =

Canadian novelist, music critic, and blogger

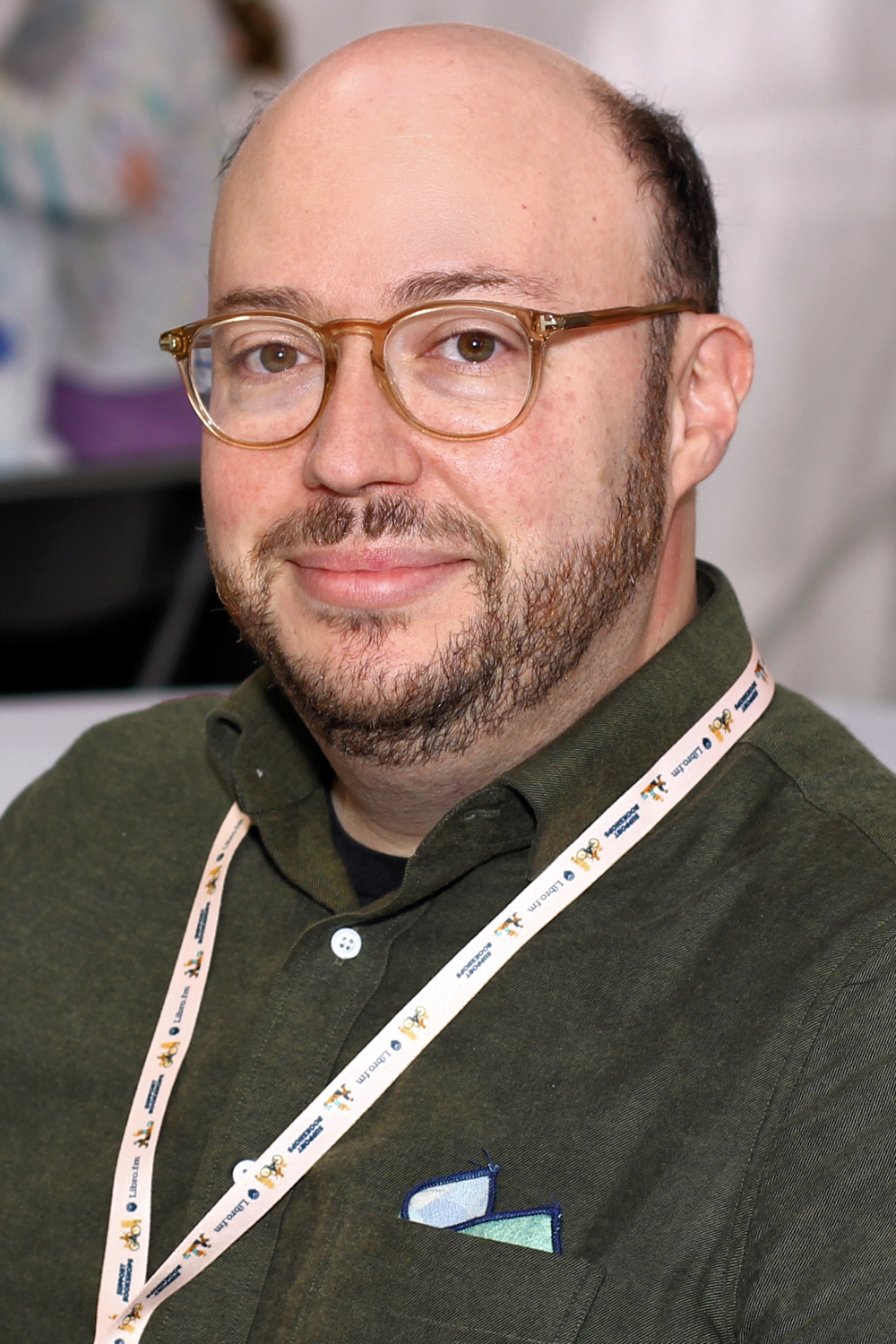
- Michaels at the 2023 Texas Book Festival
- Born: 1982 (age 43–44); Stirling, Scotland
- Occupations: Novelist, music blogger
- Writing career
- Period: 2000s–present
- Notable work: Us Conductors

Sean Michaels (born 1982) is a Canadian novelist, music critic, and blogger, based in Montreal, Quebec. Michaels’ first novel, Us Conductors won the 2014 Scotiabank Giller Prize. His second, The Wagers (2019), was named “a wistful and wonderful adventure” by Booklist. His third, Do You Remember Being Born?, was praised by the Globe & Mail as “wildly unique…it might be the forebear of a whole new genre of writing."

As a music critic and journalist, Michaels has written for publications such as The Guardian, McSweeney's, The Believer, Pitchfork, Maisonneuve, The Observer, The Wire and The National Post. His weekly music column, Heartbeats, debuted in The Globe & Mail in 2015.

== Early life ==
Michaels was born in Stirling, Scotland. He was raised in Ottawa, Ontario. He relocated to Montreal, Quebec to study at McGill University.

== Early career ==
Michaels initially came to prominence as founder of Said the Gramophone, one of the first mp3 blogs, where he was among the first music critics to write about Arcade Fire, Beirut, Nicolas Jaar and Feist. His music criticism is known for a dreamy, literary writing style, contributing to his work as a writer in residence for events like the Dawson City Music Festival and, since 2009, Sappyfest. Six years after its founding, Said the Gramophone was recognized by Time as one of the world's 25 best blog and was profiled in the book Track Changes: The Origin Story of Canadian Music on the Internet (1990-2010).

His articles about travel, food and culture have appeared in Brick, The Walrus, and Reader's Digest. In 2010, Michaels was awarded a gold prize at the Canadian National Magazine Awards for a feature concerning the Parisian art guerrillas Les UX; this article first appeared in Brick and was later re-published by Gizmodo. He received a second National Magazine Award in 2013, for an article on Canadian circus, published by The Walrus.

Michaels also writes short fiction; his short stories has been published in Maisonneuve, The New Quarterly, The Lifted Brow, and the anthologies We Are the Friction and The Art of Trespassing.

Since 2009, Michaels has given several lectures on contemporary journalism and the music industry, including appearances at McGill University, Emerson College, Concordia University, and the Pop Montreal Symposium. He is a member of the Polaris Music Prize jury and assisted on the grand jury which selected Godspeed You! Black Emperor's 'Allelujah! Don't Bend! Ascend! as the best Canadian album of 2013.

In 2010, Michaels formed an absurdist improv duo with Vinny Francois called Venezuela. They performed several early shows at the Montreal Improv Theatre. In 2011, they were featured at the Montreal Fringe Festival and opened for Tig Notaro. His most recent theatrical credit is in Mark Slutsky's acclaimed short film Sorry, Rabbi as Hasid #5.

== Us Conductors ==
Michaels' debut novel, Us Conductors, was published by Random House Canada and Tin House Books (US) in 2014. This book is inspired by the lives of Léon Theremin, inventor of the theremin, and the musician Clara Rockmore.

Us Conductors was named the winner of the 2014 Scotiabank Giller Prize. In his acceptance speech for the award, Michaels said that as a new author, it was an "unimaginable gift" to receive support from writers and publishers. He also addressed recent scandals surrounding abuse in arts communities - notably claims against former Giller host Jian Ghomeshi. "There are people in our little corner of culture who behave monstrously," he said. "We have to reckon with that, and change it. Each of us does." The novel was also subsequently awarded the Hugh MacLennan Prize for Fiction and named as a nominee for the International Dublin Literary Award, the Amazon.ca First Novel Award, the inaugural Kirkus Prize and the CLMP Firecracker Award for Fiction.
