= Hedley Fowler =

Royal Air Force pilot (1916–1944)

Hedley Nevile Fowler MC
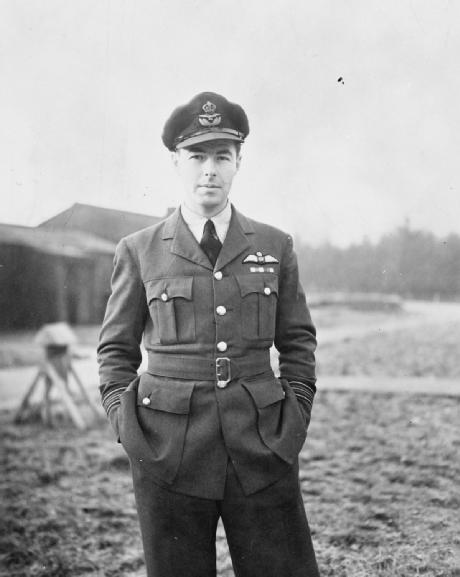
- Born: 8 June 1916; London, United Kingdom
- Died: 26 March 1944 (aged 27); Dorset, United Kingdom
- Relatives: Henry Ayers
- Military career
- Allegiance: (United Kingdom) British Empire
- Branch: Royal Air Force
- Service years: 1936–1944
- Rank: Squadron leader
- Nickname: Bill
- Units: 3 Squadron; 615 Squadron; Armament Test Squadron
- Conflicts: World War II: Battle of France
- Awards: Military Cross

Hedley Nevile 'Bill' Fowler MC (8 June 1916 – 26 March 1944) was a British Royal Air Force pilot who became a prisoner of war and successfully escaped from Oflag IV-C at Colditz during the Second World War.

== Early life ==
Fowler was born in London on 8 June 1916. He was educated at Rugby School. His father was a Paymaster-Commander in the Royal Navy and he was great-grandson of Sir Henry Ayers, a Premier of South Australia for whom Ayers Rock was named. Fowler's family moved to Adelaide in South Australia in 1920, before returning to the UK in 1924 so Fowler could attend Rugby School. He returned to Australia in 1933, before enlisting in the Royal Australian Air Force in 1936, and then transferring to the Royal Air Force (RAF).

== Fighter pilot ==
Fowler was granted a short-service commission in the RAF as a pilot officer on 19 February 1937. He was trained at No 6 Flying Training School at Netheravon before being posted to 3 Squadron on 22 May 1937. He then served as a fighter pilot with 615 Squadron commanded by Squadron Leader Joseph Kayll, flying the Gloster Gladiator. He joined the Squadron in October 1939 before converting to Hawker Hurricanes in May 1940.

Fowler and 615 Squadron arrived in France in November 1939 as part of the Air Component of the BEF. When the German invasion of the west commenced on 10 May 1940, the Squadron was still converting onto Hurricanes, although they were in action from the very start. Fowler made his first 'kill' on 12 May 1940 when he shot down a Bf 109. This was also the Squadron's first kill. He was credited with shooting down a Dornier Do 17 on 14 May 1940 as well, followed by another Bf 109 the next day. During the same engagement he was also shot down. He bailed out and landed in the Ardennes Forest where he met some French soldiers retreating from the front line. However the next day, 16 May, the group was surrounded and forced to surrender. As a result, Fowler became a prisoner of war.

He was promoted to flight lieutenant on 3 September 1940 whilst in captivity.

== Prisoner of war ==
Fowler was sent to Dulag Luft transit camp at Oberursel before being transferred to Stalag Luft I at Barth, arriving there on 5 July 1940.

=== Stalag Luft I and first escape ===
By November 1941, Fowler was acting as a distributor of Red Cross parcels. During his time in captivity Fowler had been making a bogus German uniform out of various bits of material and a civilian suit, smuggling them into the parcel office which was outside the main prisoners' compound. On 5 November 1941, he dressed in his bogus German uniform from the parcel office and climbed over the lightly guarded perimeter fence. Outside the camp he changed into his civilian suit. He managed to reach Sassnitz and attempted to stow away on a Swedish ship; but whilst at the docks he was arrested by a German policeman. He was returned to Stalag Luft I and sentenced to 14 days solitary confinement, before being transferred to the 'escape proof' camp Oflag IV-C at Colditz Castle, arriving on 1 December 1941.

Pete Tunstall claims that Fowler, whilst at Barth, was the first in World War II to use the term 'goons' to describe the guards, referencing a well-known comic strip. Tunstall claims the term caught like wildfire through all the prison camps in Germany. "Goons up" became a warning cry for approaching guards, "goon boxes" described the machine gun towers, any manmade uniforms used to escape were called "goon skins," and their favourite recreation of winding the guards up become known as "goon baiting."

=== Colditz Castle and successful escape ===
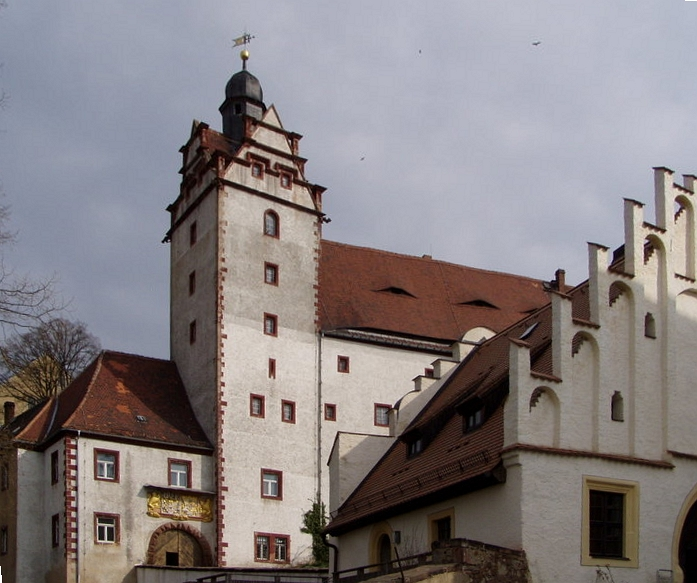
Colditz Castle

During his time at Colditz, Fowler took part in 'goon baiting', which involved harassing and annoying the German guards as much as possible, under the able direction of Douglas Bader. For this, Fowler – as many others – spent time in solitary confinement. During August 1942 an escape plan was prepared for a party of officers moving through a short tunnel which started in the German Stabsfeldwebel's (sergeant major) office located near the prisoner's sick quarters. The starting location was chosen because it was a place unlikely to be thoroughly searched. Fowler was involved from the outset. The prisoners picked the office's lock and over a few nights built a tunnel which led from under the Stabsfeldwebel's desk to a clothing store with access to the outside. The tunnel was partly constructed by Captain Pat Reid.

From the clothing store the prisoners were to leave the castle disguised as a work party removing clothes from the store, four to be dressed as Polish orderlies, one disguised as a German officer, the other as a German NCO. The six officers were Fowler, Captain Lulu Lawton (British Army), Lieutenant Geoff Wardle (Royal Navy) and three Dutch officers, Lt Beitz, Lt Donkers and Lt Damiaen Joan van Doorninck. The escape took place on 9 September 1942. All went well as the six escapers and two assistants entered the office during the previous evening and opened up the tunnel. However, around midnight there was an alarm and the Germans searched the castle. Fortunately for the prisoners, the office door had been relocked and this satisfied the searchers that nobody had entered the office. After entering the clothing store the tunnel was sealed to allow later use (it was discovered the following day during the search for the missing officers). At 0730 the escape party left the store, timed to be shortly after the change of the German sentries; the idea being that the new sentries would be unaware of who had already entered the store. The party, led by van Doorninck (dressed as the German NCO), proceeded past several sentries and using a forged pass, left the castle unaccosted.

Outside the camp the party changed into civilian clothes and separated, Fowler travelling with van Doornick. They travelled on foot to Penig (about 31 km) and from there by train to Plauen via Zwickau. They caught the train to Stuttgart where they stayed overnight in a small hotel. The next day they caught a train to Tuttlingen and walked to the Swiss border. En route they were stopped by an SS policeman, but their forged papers were sufficient to pass inspection. They crossed into Switzerland at 0130 on 13 September 1942, and were taken to the British legation at Bern. The other four escapers were recaptured close to Colditz.

=== Return to the UK ===
Fowler left Switzerland on 25 January 1943 and with Major Ronald B. Littledale, who had escaped from Colditz with Pat Reid, travelled across unoccupied France into Spain on 30 January 1943. They were arrested by the Spanish authorities later the same day. They were taken to a military prison at Figueras and held in filthy and cramped conditions until 22 February 1943. They were then taken to the British Consul in Barcelona from where they travelled to Gibraltar, arriving on 25 March 1943. Fowler returned to the UK shortly afterwards.

For his successful escape, Fowler was awarded the Military Cross, which was gazetted on 14 December 1943.

== Death ==
On reaching the UK, Fowler was promoted to squadron leader, and posted to the Armament Test Squadron at Boscombe Down to act as a test pilot. He was killed during an air test flying a Hawker Typhoon on 26 March 1944. The Typhoon disintegrated following a dive, killing Fowler. He was buried at Durrington cemetery.
