= No. 615 Squadron RAuxAF =

Defunct flying squadron of the Royal Air Force

No. 615 (County of Surrey) Squadron RAuxAF
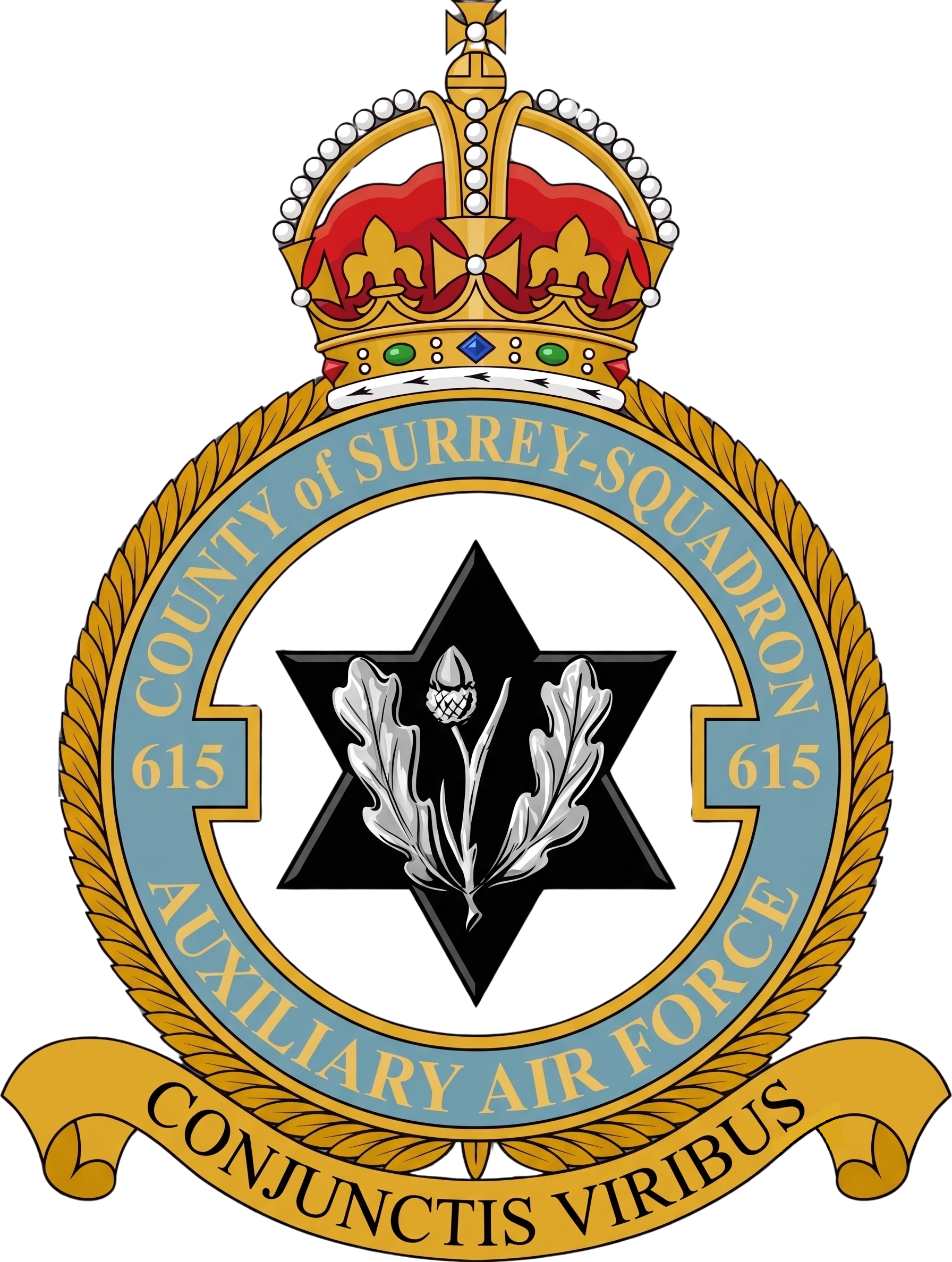
- Squadron badge of No. 615 Squadron
- Active: 1 Jun 1937 – 10 Jun 1945; 10 Jun 1945 – 25 Sep 1945; 10 May 1946 – 10 Mar 1957
- Country: United Kingdom
- Branch: Royal Air Force
- Part of: Royal Auxiliary Air Force
- Nickname: County of Surrey 'Churchill's Own'
- Mottos: Latin: Conjunctis viribus (Translation: "By our united force")
- Engagements: Battle of France; Battle of Britain

Commanders
- Honorary Air Commodore: Winston Churchill
- Notable commanders: Neville Duke (Test pilot)

Insignia
- Squadron Badge heraldry: On a star of six points, an oak sprig fructed.
- Squadron Codes: RR (Nov 1938 – Sep 1939); KW (Sep 1939 – Sep 1945); RAV (Jul 1946 – 1949); V6 (1949 – Apr 1951)
- Post-1950 squadron roundel

No. 615 (County of Surrey) Squadron was a unit of the British Auxiliary Air Force and later the Royal Auxiliary Air Force between 1937 and 1957.

== History ==
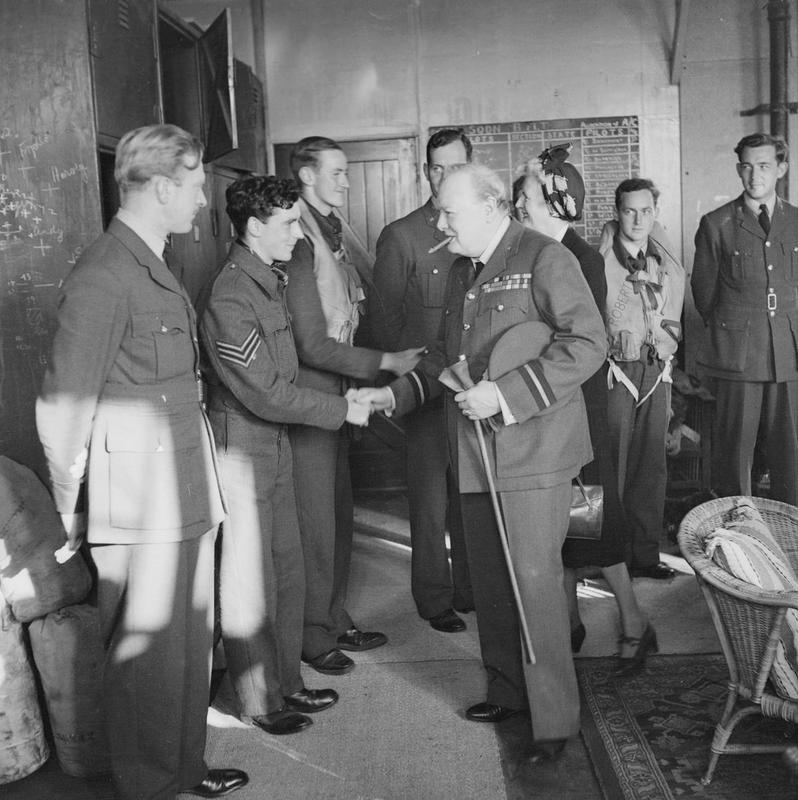
Members of the squadron meeting Winston Churchill in 1941

=== Formation and early years ===
No. 615 squadron was formed at RAF Kenley as part of the Auxiliary Air Force on 1 June 1937 and was initially equipped with the Hawker Audax in the army-cooperation role. By the end of the year it had received Hawker Hectors which it flew until November 1938, when it became a fighter squadron and received Gloster Gauntlets.^{[Nb 1]}

=== Second World War ===
1939–1942

The squadron re-equipped with Gloster Gladiators in May 1939, taking them to France as part of the Air Component of the British Expeditionary Force in November 1939. Pilot conversion to the Hawker Hurricane took place in the early months of 1940, with the aircraft themselves finally arriving in May 1940 as the German invasion of France got under way. The next couple of weeks were marked by chaos and constant shuffling between bases that included Vitry-en-Artois, Saint-Inglevert, Poix, Abbeville & Moorsele (Belgium). On 20 May 1940 whilst some ground crew & equipment were already making their way towards evacuation via Boulogne, patrols were still being carried out, with an He-111 shot down by PO Petrus Hugo. Finally the last nine serviceable Hurricanes flew home to RAF Kenley, whilst non-flying crew returned to England in the steamer Biarritz from Boulogne, arriving at Dover on 21 May 1940.

615 squadron took part in the early actions of the Battle of Britain, but then moved to Scotland to rest. It later took part in offensive sweeps over Europe and defence duties in Wales.

1942–45

In April 1942 the squadron was transferred to the South East Asian theatre, initially to India, before moving closer to the front lines in Burma, during December 1942. but returned to India to re-equip in May 1943, receiving Supermarine Spitfires in October. It returned to operations on the Burma front in November but was recalled to India again, for defensive duties in August 1944. The transfer, from Palel to Biagachi, near Calcutta was scheduled for 10 August. Despite a favourable weather forecast, the squadron encountered a violent monsoon storm en route. Eight of the 16 aircraft, including that of the commanding officer, Squadron Leader Dave McCormack, DFC, were lost.

1945

The squadron returned to Burma in February 1945. On 10 June 1945, the 615 Squadron was officially disbanded – although No. 135 Squadron RAF was renamed 615 Squadron that same day, at RAF Cuttack, Orissa. The new 615 Squadron was equipped with Republic Thunderbolts and began training for proposed landings in Malaya. Air support was not required, however, following the surrender of Japan and the squadron disbanded on 25 September at RAF Vizagapatam, Andhra Pradesh.

=== Post-war ===
With the reactivation of the Royal Auxiliary Air Force, No. 615 Squadron was reformed on 10 May 1946 at RAF Biggin Hill as a day fighter squadron equipped with Spitfire F.14s. Spitfire F.21s were received in 1947 and these were replaced by F.22s in 1948, both marks being flown until 1950.

600 and 615 squadron were great rivals. No 600 had the Queen Mother as Honorary Air Commodore and 615 had Sir Winston Churchill. When the Queen Mother first flew in the pilot's seat of a Comet she caused a telegram to be sent saying: "Today I have flown higher and faster than any of the pilots at Biggin Hill." On another occasion when Sir Winston Churchill was at Biggin he called over the CO of the rival squadron and asked him to send a telegram to the Queen Mother saying:"I have today presented to my squadron the Esher Trophy." Later he wrote: 'It was a great joy to me to be made an honorary member of 615. They were equally good at work or play. I remember visiting them at summer camp at Horsham St Faith. After the day's flying the squadron funds were raided and launches hired on the Norfolk Broads. At one or two selected stopping-places the adjutant went into the nearest hostelry and to the consternation of the locals ordered 86 pints and four lemonades'.

The squadron re-equipped with Gloster Meteor F.4 jet fighters starting in September 1950. Meteor F.8s were received in September 1951 and these were flown in the annual UK air defence exercises and at annual summer training camps. Along with all other flying units of the RAuxAF, No. 615 was disbanded on 10 March 1957.

== Notable Squadron members ==
- Winston Churchill, appointed Honorary Air Commodore of the Squadron on 4 April 1939.
- Neville Duke, famous test pilot.
- Hedley Fowler, achieved the squadron's first kill; became a PoW and later escaped from Colditz.
- Arthur Vere Harvey, squadron commander; a Conservative Member of Parliament post-war.
- Petrus Hugo, South African ace and Commanding Officer
- Joseph Kayll, commander during Battle of France, then Battle of Britain Ace.
- Ronald Gustave Kellett, Second World War ace and post-war commander of the squadron
- Henry Lafont, Famous Free French pilot of the Second World War, who died on 2 December 2011, the last surviving French veteran of the Battle of Britain. With René Mouchotte (below), escaped from Algeria in 1940 and flew to Gibraltar to join the Free French forces.
- René Mouchotte, Famous Free French pilot of the Second World War who died on 27 August 1943, first Free-French officer to hold the position of flight commander in the RAF. His memoirs were published in 1946 under the title Les carnets de René Mouchotte.
- Alexander Obolensky, A Russian Prince, and popularly known as "The Flying Prince", "The Flying Slav", or simply as "Obo". An international rugby player for England, scored 2 tries in a legendary All Blacks match. Died 29 March 1940 in a Hawker Hurricane training accident.
- James Sanders, Second World War ace

== Aircraft operated ==
Aircraft operated by no. 615 Squadron RAF, data from
From	To	Aircraft	Version
June 1937	March 1938	Hawker Audax	
December 1937	November 1938	Hawker Hector	Mk.I
November 1938	September 1939	Gloster Gauntlet ^{[Nb 1]}	Mk.II
June 1939	October 1939	Gloster Gladiator	Mk.I
October 1939	May 1940	Gloster Gladiator ^{[Nb 2]}	Mk.II
April 1940	February 1941	Hawker Hurricane	Mk.I
February 1941	April 1941	Hawker Hurricane	Mk.IIa
April 1941	July 1941	Hawker Hurricane	Mk.I
July 1941	March 1942	Hawker Hurricane	Mk.IIb
September 1941	October 1943	Hawker Hurricane	Mk.IIc
October 1943	August 1944	Supermarine Spitfire	Mk.Vc
June 1944	June 1945	Supermarine Spitfire	Mk.VIII
June 1945	September 1945	Republic Thunderbolt	Mk.II
October 1946	January 1949	Supermarine Spitfire	F.14
January 1947	June 1950	Supermarine Spitfire	F.21
July 1948	September 1950	Supermarine Spitfire	F.22
September 1950	September 1951	Gloster Meteor	F.4
September 1951	March 1957	Gloster Meteor	F.8

=== Notes on Aircraft Types ===
1. Although only introduced in 1935, within two years the RAF began to procure even more advanced fighters for front-line squadrons, allowing Gauntlets to be transferred to freshly-formed or reserve units, serving as their first or interim equipment for training in advance of receiving newer aircraft.
2. Whilst 615 Squadron were re-equipping with Hawker Hurricanes towards the end of this period, "B" flight were still equipped with Gladiators, and it was 12 aircraft of this type that served in France until joined by 9 Hurricanes in mid May 1940. With the fall of Dunkirk, 615 sqdn returned to England, posting a detachment of Gladiators ("G" flight) to RAF Manston for the final days of May 1940

== Squadron bases ==
Bases and airfields used by no. 615 Squadron RAF, data from
From	To	Base
1 June 1937	29 August 1938	RAF Kenley, Surrey
29 August 1938	4 September 1938	RAF Old Sarum, Wiltshire
4 September 1938	2 September 1939	RAF Kenley, Surrey
2 September 1939	15 November 1939	RAF Croydon, Surrey
15 November 1939	13 December 1939	Merville, France
13 December 1939	12 April 1940	Vitry-en-Artois, France
12 April 1940	27 April 1940	Poix, France
27 April 1940	16 May 1940	Abbeville, France
16 May 1940	20 May 1940	Morsele, Belgium
20 May 1940	29 August 1940	RAF Kenley, Surrey
29 August 1940	10 October 1940	RAF Prestwick, Ayrshire, Scotland
10 October 1940	17 December 1940	RAF Northolt, Middlesex
17 December 1940	21 April 1941	RAF Kenley, Surrey
21 April 1941	11 September 1941	RAF Valley, Anglesey, Wales
11 September 1941	27 November 1941	RAF Manston, Kent
27 November 1941	24 January 1942	RAF Angle, Pembrokeshire, Wales
24 January 1942	17 March 1942	RAF Fairwood Common, Swansea, Wales
17 March 194	17 June 1942	en route to British India
17 June 1942	5 December 1942	RAF Jessore, Bengal
5 December 1942	6 May 1943	RAF Feni, Bengal
6 May 1943	1 November 1943	RAF Alipore, Bengal
1 November 1943	13 December 1943	RAF Chittagong, Bengal
13 December 1943	25 February 1944	RAF Dohazari, Bengal
25 February 1944	19 March 1944	RAF Nazir
19 March 1944	5 May 1944	RAF Silchar West, Assam
5 May 1944	23 May 1944	RAF Dergaon, Assam
23 May 1944	10 August 1944	RAF Palel, Manipur
10 August 1944	23 February 1945	RAF Baigachi
23 February 1945	15 April 1945	RAF Nidania
15 April 1945	22 May 1945	RAF Chharra, United Province
22 May 1945	29 May 1945	RAF Chakulia, Bihar
29 May 1945	10 June 1945	RAF Cuttack, Orissa
10 June 1945	8 July 1945	RAF Akyab, Burma
8 July 1945	25 September 1945	RAF Vizagapatam, Andhra Pradesh
10 May 1946	10 March 1957	RAF Biggin Hill, Kent

== Commanding officers ==
Officers commanding no. 615 Squadron RAF, data from
From	To	Name
June 1937	March 1940	S/Ldr. A.V. Harvey
March 1940	December 1940	S/Ldr. J.R. Kyall, DSO, DFC
December 1940	February 1941	S/Ldr. Holmwood
February 1941	April 1941	S/Ldr. Anthony Eyre, DFC
April 1941	July 1941	S/Ldr. G.F. Powell-Shedden
July 1941	February 1942	S/Ldr. D.E. Gillam, DSO, DFC & Bar, AFC
February 1942	December 1942	S/Ldr. B.L. Duckenfield, DFC
January 1943	March 1943	S/Ldr. W.D. Williams, DFC
March 1943	January 1944	S/Ldr. R.H. Holland, DFC
January 1944	August 1944	S/Ldr. D.W. McCormack, DFC & Bar
August 1944	September 1944	F/Lt. K.F. Gannon
September 1944	June 1945	S/Ldr. T.H. Meyer
June 1945	September 1945	S/Ldr. P.J. Anson
July 1946	1949	S/Ldr. R.G. Kellett, DSO, DFC
1949	1950	S/Ldr. P.K. Devitt
1950	1951	S/Ldr. N.F. Duke, DSO, DFC & Two Bars, AFC
1951	January 1954	S/Ldr. F.B Sowrey, AFC
January 1954	March 1957	S/Ldr. R.A. Eeles
