= Douglas Bader =

British World War II flying ace (1910–1982)

Group Captain Sir Douglas Bader CBE DSO & Bar DFC & Bar DL FRAeS
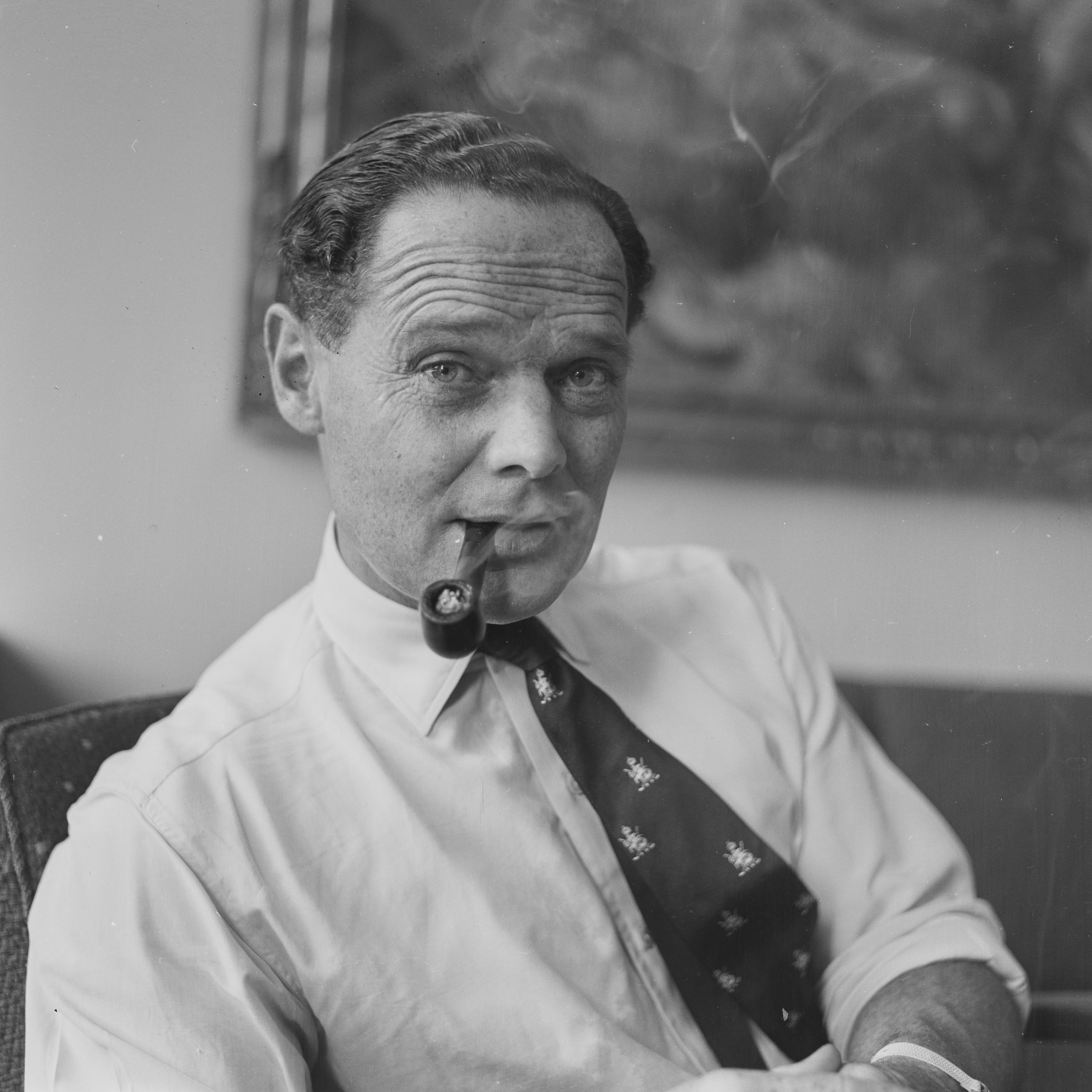
- Bader in 1955
- Born: 21 February 1910; St John's Wood, London
- Died: 5 September 1982 (aged 72); Chiswick, London
- Military career
- Allegiance: United Kingdom
- Branch: Royal Air Force
- Service years: 1928–1933; 1939–1946
- Rank: Group Captain
- Nickname: "Dogsbody" from Bader's RAF radio ID code (Note: After his promotion to Wing-Commander, Bader was no longer a member of a particular squadron, and was allowed to have his initials (D.B.) painted on the fuselage sides of his aircraft, in the place of the normal two letter squadron code. This quickly became 'Dogsbody', which his controller W/Cdr. A.B. Woodhall turned into a casual nickname.)
- Service number: 26151
- Commands: Tangmere Wing; Duxford Wing; No. 242 Squadron
- Conflicts: Second World War; Battle of France; Battle of Dunkirk; Operation Dynamo; Battle of Britain; Adlertag; The Hardest Day; Battle of Britain Day; The Blitz; Channel Front (POW)
- Awards: Knight Bachelor; Commander of the Order of the British Empire; Distinguished Service Order & Bar; Distinguished Flying Cross & Bar; Mentioned in Despatches
- Other work: Aviation consultant Disabled activist

Group Captain Sir Douglas Robert Steuart Bader (/ˈbɑːdər/; 21 February 1910 – 5 September 1982) was a Royal Air Force flying ace during the Second World War, who achieved great success despite loss of the lower part of both his legs after a 1931 air crash, one amputation above the knee and the other below the knee. Resuming flying in 1939 after being re-checked for his flying abilities, he became a front-line fighter leader. He was credited with 22 aerial victories, four shared victories, six probables, one shared probable and 11 enemy aircraft damaged.

Bader joined the RAF in 1928, and was commissioned in 1930. In December 1931, while attempting aerobatics at low level, he crashed and lost the lower part of both his legs. Having been on the brink of death, he recovered, retook flight training, passed his check flights and then requested reactivation as a pilot. Although there were no regulations applicable to his situation, he was retired against his will on medical grounds. After the outbreak of the Second World War in 1939, however, Bader returned to the RAF and was accepted as a pilot. He scored his first victories over Dunkirk during the Battle of France in 1940. He then took part in the Battle of Britain and became a friend and supporter of Air Vice Marshal Trafford Leigh-Mallory and his "Big Wing" experiments.

In August 1941, Bader parachuted out of his damaged plane over German-occupied France and was captured. Soon afterwards, he met and was befriended by Adolf Galland, a prominent German fighter ace. Despite his disability, Bader made a number of escape attempts and was eventually sent to the prisoner-of-war camp at Colditz Castle. He remained there until April 1945 when the camp was liberated by the First United States Army.

Bader left the RAF permanently in February 1946 and resumed his career in the oil industry. During the 1950s, a book and a film, Reach for the Sky, chronicled his life and RAF career to the end of the Second World War. Bader campaigned for disabled people and in the Queen's Birthday Honours 1976 was appointed a Knight Bachelor "for services to disabled people". He continued to fly until ill health forced him to stop in 1979. Bader died, aged 72, on 5 September 1982, after a heart attack.

== Early years ==
=== Childhood and education ===
Bader was born on 21 February 1910 in St John's Wood, London, the second son of Major Frederick Roberts Bader (1867–1922), a civil engineer, and his wife Jessie Scott MacKenzie. His first two years were spent with McCann relatives on the Isle of Man while his father, accompanied by Bader's mother and older brother Frederick (named after his father but called 'Derick' to distinguish the two), returned to his work in India after the birth of his son.

At the age of two, Bader joined his parents in India for a year. When his father resigned from his job in 1913, the family moved back to London and settled in Kew. Bader's father saw action in the First World War in the Royal Engineers, and was wounded in action in 1917. He remained in France after the war, where, having attained the rank of major, he died in 1922 of complications from those wounds in a hospital in Saint-Omer, the same area where Bader baled out and was captured in 1941.

Bader's mother was remarried shortly thereafter to the Reverend Ernest William Hobbs. Bader was subsequently brought up in the rectory of the village of Sprotbrough, near Doncaster, West Riding of Yorkshire. Bader's mild-mannered stepfather did not become the father figure he needed. His mother showed little interest in Bader and sent him to his grandparents on occasion. Without guidance, Bader became unruly. During one incident with an air gun, Bader shot a noted local lady through a bathroom window, as she was about to enter a bath. Later, an argument with Derick about the suffering inflicted by a pellet saw him being shot in the shoulder at point-blank range. Bader was then sent as a boarder to Temple Grove School, one of the "Famous Five" of English prep schools—one that gave its boys a Spartan upbringing.

Bader's aggressive energy found a new lease of life at St Edward's School, where he received his secondary education. During his time there, he thrived at sports; he played rugby and often enjoyed physical battles with bigger and older opponents. The then Warden (or Headmaster), Henry E. Kendall, tolerated Bader's aggressive and competitive nature. At one point, he made him a prefect despite what others saw as a strong streak of conceit in the boy. Fellow RAF pilots Guy Gibson and Adrian Warburton also attended the school. In later life, Bader's prowess on the rugby pitch was such that he was invited to play a trial (or friendly game) with the Harlequins, but it is not clear whether he actually played.

Bader's sporting interests continued into his military service. He was selected for the Royal Air Force cricket team, to play a first-class match against the Army at The Oval in July 1931. He scored 65 and 1. In August, he played in a two-day game against the Royal Navy. He played cricket in a German prisoner-of-war camp after his capture in 1941, despite his later disability.

In mid-1923, Bader, at the age of 13, was introduced to an Avro 504 during a school holiday trip to visit his aunt, Hazel, who was marrying RAF Flight Lieutenant Cyril Burge, adjutant at RAF Cranwell. Although he enjoyed the visit and took an interest in aviation, he showed no signs of becoming a keen pilot. Still very sports minded, an interest which dominated Bader's formative years, he took less of an interest in his studies. However, Bader received guidance from Warden Kendall and, with Kendall's encouragement, he excelled at his studies and was later accepted as a cadet at RAF Cranwell. Soon afterwards, he was offered a place at Oxford University, but turned it down as he preferred Cambridge University.

His mother refused to allow Bader to attend Cambridge in December 1927, claiming she could not afford the fees. A master at St. Edwards, a Mr Dingwall, helped pay these fees in part. Due to his new connection with Cyril Burge, Bader learned of the six annual prize cadetships offered by RAF Cranwell each year. Out of hundreds of applicants, he finished fifth. He left St Edward's in early 1928, aged 18.

=== Joining the RAF ===
In 1928, Bader joined the RAF as an officer cadet at the Royal Air Force College Cranwell in rural Lincolnshire. He continued to excel at sports, and added hockey and boxing to his repertoire. Motorcycling was tolerated at Cranwell, though cadets usually took part in banned activities such as speeding, pillion racing as well as buying and racing motorcars. Bader was involved in these activities and was close to expulsion after being caught out too often, in addition to coming in 19th out of 21 in his class examinations; however, his commanding officer (CO), Air vice-marshal Frederick Halahan gave him a private warning about his conduct.

On 13 September 1928, Bader took his first flight with his instructor, Flying Officer W. J. "Pissy" Pearson, in an Avro 504. He made his first solo flight on 19 February 1929 after 11 hours and 15 minutes of flight time.

Bader competed for the "Sword of Honour" award at the end of his two-year course, but lost to Patrick Coote, his nearest rival. Coote went on to become the Wing Commander of Western Wing, British Air Forces Greece, and was killed on 13 April 1941 while flying as an observer in a No. 211 Squadron Bristol Blenheim, L4819, flown by Flying Officer R. V. Herbert when six of the squadron's aircraft were shot down over Greece. Coote's aircraft was the first of 29 aerial victories for the Luftwaffe ace Unteroffizier, (later Leutnant) Fritz Gromotka.

On 26 July 1930, Bader was commissioned as a pilot officer into No. 23 Squadron RAF based at Kenley, Surrey. Flying Gloster Gamecocks and soon afterwards Bristol Bulldogs, Bader became a daredevil while training there, often flying illegal and dangerous stunts. While very fast for its time, the Bulldog had directional stability problems at low speeds, which made such stunts exceptionally dangerous. Strict orders were issued forbidding unauthorised aerobatics below 2,000 feet (610 m). Bader took this as an unnecessary safety rule rather than an order to be obeyed.

After one training flight at the gunnery range, Bader achieved only a 38 percent hit rate on a target. Receiving jibes from members of a rival squadron (No. 25 Squadron RAF), Bader took off to perform aerobatics and show off his skill. It was against regulations, and seven out of twenty-three accidents caused by ignoring regulations had proven fatal. The CO of No. 25 Squadron remarked that he would order Bader to face a court-martial if Bader was in his unit. The COs of Bader's unit, Harry Day and Henry Wollett, gave the pilots more latitude, although Day encouraged them to recognise their own limits.

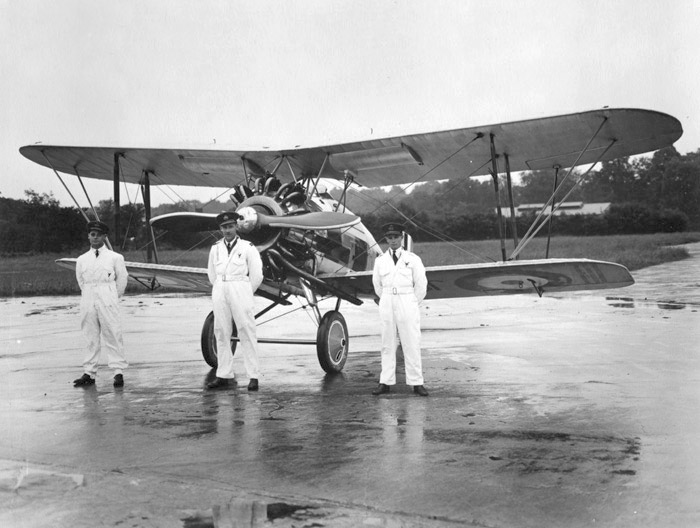
Bader, Flt Lt Harry Day and Fg Off Geoffrey Stephenson during training for the 1932 Hendon airshow, with a Gloster Gamecock

No. 23 Squadron had won the Hendon Air Show "pairs" event in 1929 and 1930. In 1931 Bader, teamed with Harry Day, successfully defended the squadron's title in the spring that year. In late 1931, Bader undertook training for the 1932 Hendon Air Show, hoping to win a second consecutive title. Two pilots had been killed attempting aerobatics. The pilots were warned not to practise these manoeuvres under 2,000 feet (610 m) and to keep above 500 feet (150 m) at all times.

Nevertheless, on 14 December 1931, while visiting Reading Aero Club, Bader attempted some low-flying aerobatics at Woodley Airfield in a Bulldog Mk. IIA, K1676, of 23 Squadron, apparently on a dare. His aircraft crashed when the tip of the left wing skimmed the ground. Bader was rushed to the Royal Berkshire Hospital, where, in the hands of the prominent surgeon J. Leonard Joyce (1882–1939), parts of both his legs were amputated—one above and one below the knee. Bader made the following laconic entry in his logbook after the crash:

Crashed slow-rolling near ground. Bad show.

— Douglas Bader

In 1932, after a long convalescence, throughout which he needed morphine for pain relief, Bader was transferred to the hospital at RAF Uxbridge and fought hard to regain his former abilities after he was given a new pair of artificial legs. In time, his agonising and determined efforts paid off, and he was able to drive a specially modified car, play golf, and even dance. During his convalescence there, he met and fell in love with Thelma Edwards, a waitress at a tea room called the Pantiles on the A30 London Road in Bagshot, Surrey.

Bader got his chance to prove that he could still fly when, in June 1932, Air Under-Secretary Philip Sassoon arranged for him to take up an Avro 504, which he piloted competently. A subsequent medical examination proved him fit for active service, but in April 1933 he was notified that the RAF had decided to reverse the decision on the grounds that this situation was not covered by King's Regulations. In May, Bader was invalided out of the RAF, took an office job with the Asiatic Petroleum Company (now Shell) and, on 5 October 1933, married Thelma Edwards.

== Second World War ==
=== Return to the Royal Air Force ===
Against a background of increasing tensions in Europe in 1937–39, Bader repeatedly requested that the Air Ministry accept him back into the Royal Air Force, and he was finally invited to a selection board meeting at Adastral House in London's Kingsway. Bader was disappointed to learn that it was only 'ground jobs' that were being offered. It appeared that he would be refused a flying position but Air Vice-Marshal Halahan, commandant of RAF College Cranwell in Bader's days there, personally endorsed him and asked the Central Flying School (CFS) at RAF Upavon, to assess his capabilities.

On 14 October 1939, the Central Flying School requested Bader report for flight tests on 18 October. He did not wait; driving down the next morning, Bader undertook refresher courses. Despite reluctance on the part of the establishment to allow him to apply for an A.1.B. (full flying category status), his persistent efforts paid off. Bader regained a medical categorisation for operational flying at the end of November 1939, and was posted to the Central Flying School for a refresher course on modern types of aircraft.

On 27 November, eight years after his accident, Bader flew solo again in an Avro Tutor; once airborne, he could not resist the temptation to turn the biplane upside down at 600 feet (180 metres) inside the circuit area. Bader subsequently progressed through the Fairey Battle and Miles Master (the last training stage before flying Spitfires and Hurricanes).

=== Phoney War ===
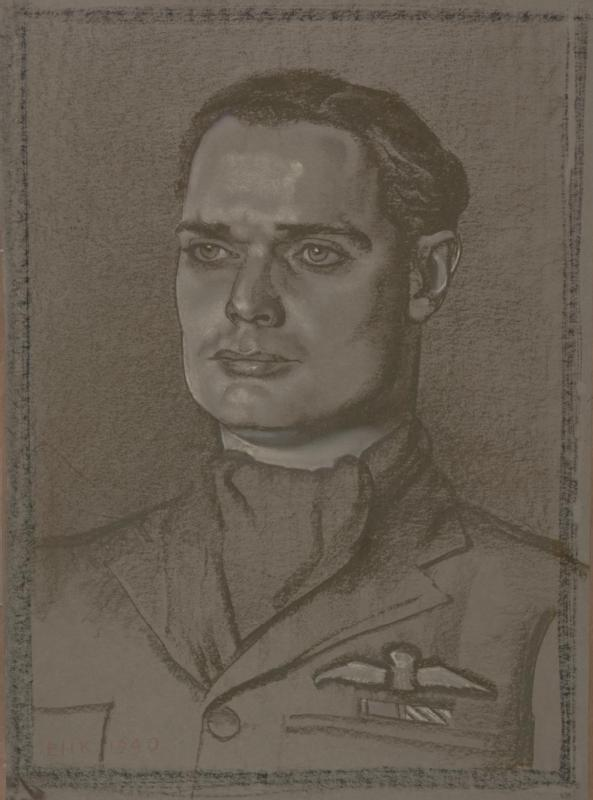
Squadron Leader D R S Bader, DSO, DFC. (1940) by Eric Kennington,(Art.IWM ART LD 832)

In January 1940, Bader was posted to No. 19 Squadron based at RAF Duxford near Cambridge, where, at 29, he was older than most of his fellow pilots. Squadron Leader Geoffrey Stephenson, a close friend from his Cranwell days, was the commanding officer, and it was here that Bader got his first glimpse of a Spitfire. It was thought that Bader's success as a fighter pilot was partly because of his having no lower legs; pilots pulling high g-forces in combat turns often blacked out as the flow of blood from the brain drained to the lower parts of the body, especially the legs. With no lower legs he could remain conscious longer, and thus had an advantage over opponents.

Between February and May 1940 Bader practised formation flying and air tactics, as well as undertaking patrols over convoys out at sea. Bader found opposition to his ideas about aerial combat. He favoured using the sun and altitude to ambush the enemy, but the RAF did not share his opinions. Official orders/doctrine dictated that pilots should fly line-astern and attack singly. Despite this being at odds with his preferred tactics, Bader obeyed orders, and his skill saw him rapidly promoted to section leader.

During this time, Bader crashed a Spitfire on take-off. He had forgotten to switch the propeller pitch from coarse to fine, resulting in the aircraft careering down the runway at 80 mph before crashing. Despite a head wound, Bader got into another Spitfire for a second attempt. On the way to his room after the flight, he thought he had injured himself as he found it difficult to walk. He soon discovered that his artificial legs had been buckled from having been forced beneath the rudder pedals during the crash. He realised that if he had not lost his legs previously, he would have definitely lost them this time. Bader was subsequently promoted from flying officer to flight lieutenant, and appointed as a flight commander of No. 222 Squadron RAF.

=== Battle of France ===
Bader had his first taste of combat with No. 222 Squadron RAF, which was based at RAF Duxford and commanded by another old friend of his, Squadron Leader "Tubby" Mermagen. On 10 May the Wehrmacht invaded Luxembourg, the Netherlands, Belgium and France. The campaigns went badly for the Western Allies and soon they were evacuating from Dunkirk during the battle for the port. RAF squadrons were ordered to provide air cover for the Royal Navy during Operation Dynamo.

While patrolling the coast near Dunkirk on 1 June 1940 at around 3,000 ft (910 m), Bader happened upon a Messerschmitt Bf 109 in front of him, flying in the same direction and at approximately the same speed. He believed that the German must have been a novice, taking no evasive action even though it took more than one burst of gunfire to shoot him down. Bader was also credited with a Messerschmitt Bf 110 damaged, despite claiming five victories in that particular dogfight.

In the next patrol Bader was credited with a Heinkel He 111 damaged. On 4 June 1940, his encounter with a Dornier Do 17, which was attacking Allied shipping, involved a near collision while he was firing at the aircraft's rear gunner during a high-speed pass. Shortly after Bader joined 222 Squadron, it moved to RAF Kirton in Lindsey, just south of the Humber.

After flying operations over Dunkirk, on 28 June 1940 Bader was posted to command No. 242 Squadron RAF as acting squadron leader. A Hawker Hurricane squadron based at RAF Coltishall, No. 242 Squadron was mainly made up of Canadians who had suffered high losses in the Battle of France and when Bader arrived were suffering from low morale. Despite initial resistance to their new commanding officer, the pilots (including such aces as Willie McKnight and Stan Turner) were soon won over by Bader's strong personality and perseverance, especially in cutting through red tape to make the squadron operational again. Bader transformed No. 242 Squadron back into an effective fighting unit. Bader had three Royal Navy officers in No. 242 Squadron, including his wingman Richard "Dickie" Cork. Upon the formation of No. 12 Group RAF, No. 242 Squadron was assigned to the group while based at RAF Duxford. No. 242 Squadron became fully operational on 9 July 1940.

=== Battle of Britain ===
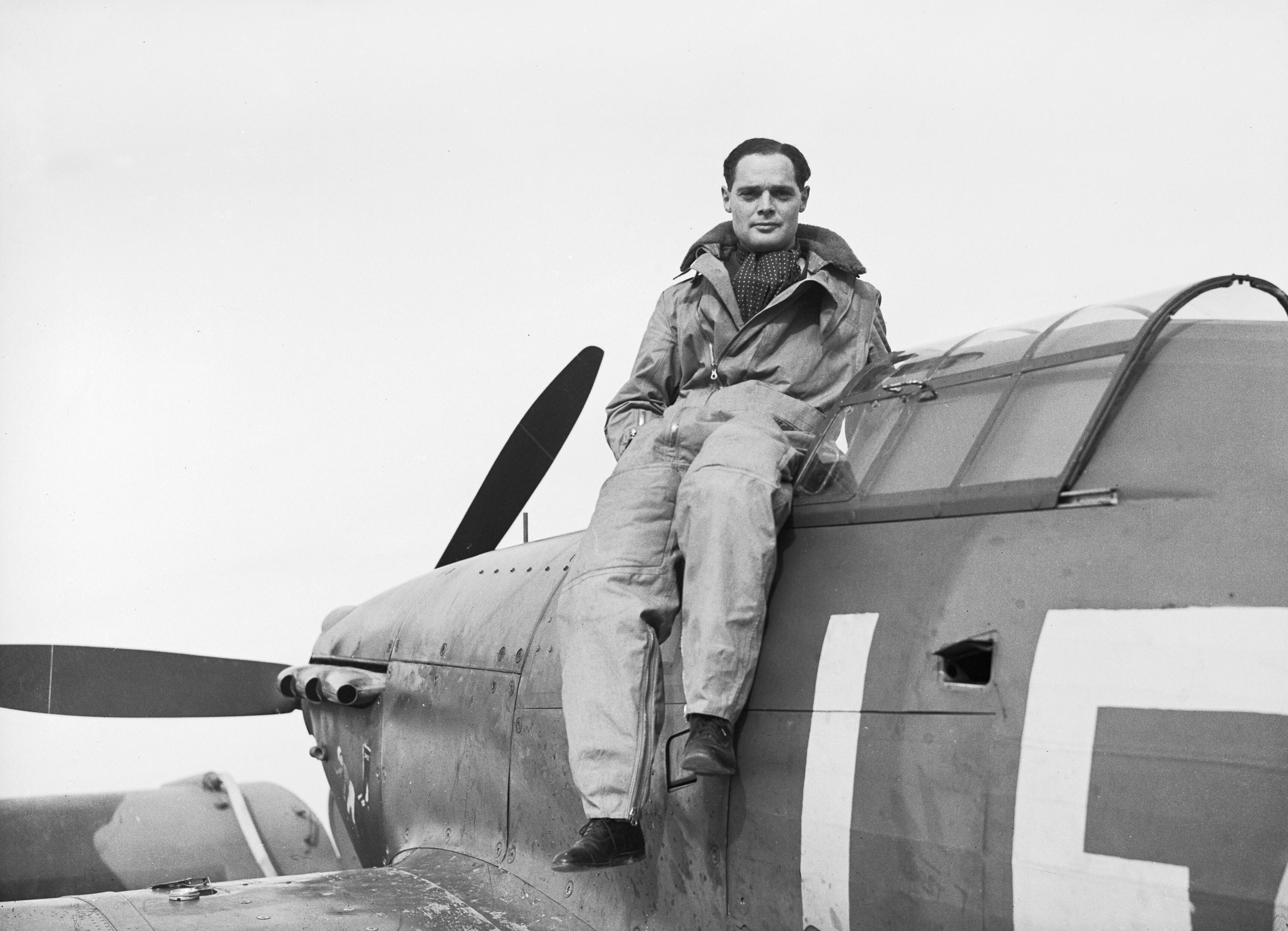
Bader, commanding officer of No. 242 Squadron, sitting on his Hurricane at Duxford during the Battle of Britain in September 1940

After the French campaign, the RAF prepared for the coming Battle of Britain in which the Luftwaffe intended to achieve air supremacy. Once attained, the Germans would attempt to launch Operation Sea Lion, the codename for an invasion of Britain. The battle officially began on 10 July 1940.

On 11 July, Bader scored his first victory with his new squadron. The cloud base was down to just 600 ft while drizzle and mist covered most of the sky, and forward visibility was down to just 2,000 yards. Bader was alone on patrol, and was soon directed toward an enemy aircraft flying north up the Norfolk coast.

Spotting the aircraft at 600 yards, Bader recognised it as a Dornier Do 17, and after he closed to 250 yards its rear gunner opened fire. Bader continued his attack and fired two bursts into the bomber before it vanished into cloud. The Dornier, which crashed into the sea off Cromer, was later confirmed by a member of the Royal Observer Corps. On 21 August, a similar engagement took place. This time, a Dornier went into the sea off Great Yarmouth and again the Observer Corps confirmed the claim. There were no survivors.

Later in the month, Bader scored a further two victories over Messerschmitt Bf 110s. On 30 August 1940, No. 242 Squadron was moved to Duxford again and found itself in the thick of the fighting. On this date, the squadron claimed 10 enemy aircraft, Bader scoring two victories against Bf 110s. Other squadrons were involved, and it was impossible to verify which RAF units were responsible for the damage on the enemy. On 7 September, two more Bf 110s were shot down, but in the same engagement Bader was badly hit by a Messerschmitt Bf 109. Bader almost baled out, but recovered the Hurricane. Other pilots witnessed one of Bader's victims crash.

On 7 September, Bader claimed two Bf 109s shot down, followed by a Junkers Ju 88. On 9 September, Bader claimed another Dornier. During the same mission, he attacked a He 111 only to discover he was out of ammunition. Enraged, he thought about ramming it and slicing off the rudder with his propeller, but turned away when he regained his composure. On 14 September, Bader was awarded the Distinguished Service Order (DSO) for his combat leadership.

On 15 September, known as the Battle of Britain Day, Bader damaged a Do 17 and a Ju 88, while destroying another Do 17 in the afternoon. Bader flew several missions that day, which involved heavy air combat. The original combat report states that he destroyed one enemy aircraft, claimed no probable, but did claim several damaged. The Dornier's gunner attempted to bail out, but his parachute was caught on the tail wheel and he died when the aircraft crashed into the Thames Estuary. Further detail suggests Bader took pity on the gunner and "tried to kill him to put him out of his misery". Another Do 17 and a Ju 88 were claimed on 18 September. A Bf 109 was claimed on 27 September. Bader's DSO was gazetted on 1 October 1940. On 24 September, he had been promoted to the war substantive rank of flight lieutenant.

=== "Big Wing" tactic ===
As a supporter of his 12 Group commander, Air Vice Marshal Trafford Leigh-Mallory, Bader joined him as an active exponent of the controversial "Big Wing" theory which provoked much debate in the RAF during the battle.

Bader was an outspoken critic of the careful "husbanding" tactics for his fighters which was used by Air Vice Marshal Keith Park, the commander of 11 Group. Park was supported by Fighter Command Air Chief Marshal Sir Hugh Dowding, the overall commander.

Bader, from his position north of Park's area of operation, campaigned for a policy of assembling large formations of defensive fighters north of London ready to inflict maximum damage on the massed German bomber formations as they flew over South East England. The other side of this argument is that in the time it took to organise such large formations, the enemy could bomb their targets and only be engaged on the way back to their bases.

As the Battle progressed, Bader was at the head of a large wing of fighters consisting of up to five squadrons, known as the "Duxford Wing". However, the Big Wing often took too long to form up, over-claimed victories, and did not provide timely support of the over-committed 11 Group which was closer to German attacks.

The episode probably contributed to the departure of Park to an appointment in Malta, replaced with Leigh-Mallory in November 1940. Park later became an Air Chief Marshal for his achievements.

Meanwhile, Dowding was retired, having come to the end of his RAF service.

While it is not known whether Mallory and Bader were aware that the claims of the RAF and Big Wings were exaggerated. However, they certainly tried to use them as a potent tool with which to remove Park and Dowding from command and pursue the Big Wing tactic.

After the war, Bader insisted that both he and Leigh-Mallory wanted the Big Wing tactic enacted in 12 Group only. They both believed, according to Bader, that it was impractical to use it in 11 Group, as the command was located too close to the enemy and would not have enough time to assemble.

RAF ace Johnnie Johnson offered his own view of Bader and the Big Wing:

Douglas was all for the Big Wings to counter the German formation[s]. I think there was room for both tactics—the Big Wings and the small squadrons. It might well have been fatal had Park always tried to get his squadrons into Big Wings ("Balbos"), for not only would they have taken longer to get to their height, but sixty or seventy packed climbing fighters could have been seen for miles and would have been sitting ducks for higher 109s. Göring would have been pleased for his 109s to pounce on large numbers of RAF fighters. Indeed, Adolf Galland and Werner Mölders complained about the elusiveness of Fighter Command and Park's brilliance was that by refusing to concentrate his force he preserved it throughout the battle. This does not mean, as Bader pointed out at the time, that two or three Balbos from 10 and 12 Groups, gaining height beyond the range of the 109s, would not have played a terrific part in the fighting.

During the Battle of Britain, Bader used three Hawker Hurricanes. The first was P3061, in which he scored six air victories. The second aircraft was unknown (possibly "P3090"), but Bader did score one victory and two damaged in it on 9 September. The third was V7467, in which he destroyed four more and added one probable and two damaged by the end of September. The machine was lost on 1 September 1941 while on a training exercise.

On 12 December 1940, Bader was awarded the Distinguished Flying Cross (DFC) for his services during the Battle of Britain. His unit, No. 242 Squadron, had claimed 62 aerial victories. Bader was gazetted on 7 January 1941. By this time, he was an acting squadron leader.

=== Wing leader ===
Douglas Bader by Cuthbert Orde, March 1941

On 18 March 1941, Bader was promoted to acting wing commander and became one of the first "wing leaders". Stationed at Tangmere with 145, 610 and 616 Squadrons under his command, Bader led his wing of Spitfires on sweeps and "Circus" operations (medium bomber escort) over north-western Europe throughout the summer campaign. These were missions combining bombers and fighters designed to lure out and tie down German Luftwaffe fighter units that might otherwise serve on the Russian front. One of the wing leader's "perks" was permission to have his initials marked on his aircraft as personal identification, thus "D-B" was painted on the side of Bader's Spitfire. These letters gave rise to his radio call-sign "Dogsbody".

During 1941 his wing was re-equipped with Spitfire VBs, which had two Hispano 20 mm cannon and four .303 machine guns. Bader flew a Mk VA equipped with eight .303 machine guns, as he insisted that these guns were more effective against fighter opposition. His tactics required a close-in approach in which he felt the lower calibre weapons had a more devastating effect. At the time, RAF trials with wing-mounted cannons had also revealed a number of shortcomings that precluded a widespread acceptance of the armament.

Bader's combat missions were mainly fought against Bf 109s over France and the Channel. On 7 May 1941 he shot down one Bf 109 and claimed another as a probable victory. The German formation belonged to Jagdgeschwader 26 (JG 26 – Fighter Wing 26), which on that date was led in action by German ace Adolf Galland, and was also when Galland claimed his 68th victory. Bader and Galland met again 94 days later. On 21 June 1941, Bader shot down a Bf 109E off the coast near Desvres. His victory was witnessed by two other pilots who saw a Bf 109 crash and the German pilot bale out. On 25 June 1941 Bader shot down two more Bf 109Fs. The first was shot down between 11:58 and 13:35 off the coast of Gravelines; the pilot baled out. In the same action he shared in the destruction of another Bf 109F. The second Bf 109 was shot down in the afternoon.

The following month was more successful for Bader. On 2 July 1941 he was awarded the bar to his DSO. Later that day he claimed one Bf 109 destroyed and another damaged. On 4 July, Bader fired on a Bf 109E which slowed down so much that he nearly collided with it. Squadron Leader Burton saw the entire combat and noted the Bf 109 "fell away in a sloppy fashion", "as though the pilot had been hit". It was marked as a probable. On 6 July another Bf 109 was shot down and the pilot baled out. This victory was witnessed by Pilot Officers Johnnie Johnson and Alan Smith (Bader's usual wingman).

On 9 July, Bader claimed one probable and one damaged, both trailing coolant or oil. On 10 July Bader claimed a Bf 109 (and one damaged) over Bethune. Later, Bader destroyed a Bf 109E which blew up south of, or actually over, Calais. On 12 July, Bader found further success, shooting down one Bf 109 and damaging three others between Bethune and St Omer. Bader was again gazetted on 15 July. On 23 July, Bader claimed another Bf 109 damaged and possibly destroyed, even though the action resulted in two Bf 109s destroyed. The other was shot down by Squadron Leader Burton. Bader did not see his Bf 109 crash, so he claimed it as a damaged only, despite the fact pilots of No. 242 Squadron saw two Bf 109s crash.

Bader had been pushing for more sorties to fly in late 1941 but his Wing was tired. He was intent on adding to his score, which, according to the CO of No. 616 Squadron. Billy Burton, brought the other pilots and mood in his wing to a near-mutinous state. Trafford Leigh-Mallory, Bader's immediate superior as OC No. 11 Group, Fighter Command, relented and allowed Bader to continue frequent missions over France even though his score of 20 and the accompanying strain evident on his features obliged Leigh-Mallory to consider his withdrawal from operations. Ultimately, Leigh-Mallory did not want to upset his star pilot, and did not invoke any restrictions.

=== Last combat ===
Between 24 March and 9 August 1941, Bader flew 62 fighter sweeps over France. On 9 August 1941, Bader was flying a Spitfire Mk VA serial W3185 "D-B" on an offensive patrol over the French coast, looking for Messerschmitt Bf 109s from Abbeville or Wissant without his trusted wingman Alan Smith. Smith, who was described by fellow pilot Johnnie Johnson as "leechlike" and the "perfect number two", was unable to fly on that day due to a head cold, so was in London being fitted for a new uniform ready for his officer commission. It is possible that this may have been a contributing factor as to how events unfolded.

Just after Bader's section of four aircraft crossed the coast, 12 Bf 109s were spotted flying in formation approximately 2,000 to 3,000 feet (600 to 900 metres) below them and travelling in the same direction. Bader dived on them too fast and too steeply to be able to aim and fire his guns, and barely avoided colliding with one of them. He levelled out at 24,000 feet (7,300 metres) to find that he was now alone, separated from his section, and was considering whether to return home when he spotted three pairs of Bf 109s a couple of miles in front of him. He dropped down below them and closed up before destroying one of them with a short burst of fire from close range. Bader was just opening fire on a second Bf 109, which trailed white smoke and dropped down, when he noticed the two on his left turning towards him. At this point he decided it would be better to return home; however, making the mistake of banking away from them, Bader believed he had a mid-air collision with the second of the two Bf 109s on his right that were continuing straight ahead.

Bader's fuselage, tail and fin were gone from behind him, and he lost height rapidly at what he estimated to be 400 mph (640 km/h) in a slow spin. He jettisoned the cockpit canopy, released his harness pin, and the air rushing past the open cockpit started to suck him out, but his prosthetic leg was trapped. Part way out of the cockpit and still attached to his aircraft, Bader fell for some time before he released his parachute, at which point the leg's retaining strap snapped under the strain and he was pulled free. A Bf 109 flew by some 50 yards away at around 4,000 feet (1,200 metres) but did not fire on the parachutist.

==== Controversy over cause ====
Although Bader believed for years that he had collided in midair with a Bf 109, two other possibilities have later been put forward; that he was shot down by a German Bf 109, or alternatively that he may have been a victim of friendly fire. Recent research shows no Bf 109 was lost to a collision that day, and there is also doubt that a German pilot was responsible for shooting him down. Feldwebel Max Meyer of II./JG 26 flying a Bf 109 had claimed him shot down that morning and according to Luftwaffe records a Leutnant Wolfgang Kosse of 5./JG 26 and Meyer, of 6./JG 26 were the only German pilots to claim a victory that day. Furthermore, Meyer mentioned that he had followed the downed Spitfire and watched the pilot bale out, something which seems to match this passage in Bader's memoirs:

I was floating in the sunshine above broken, white cloud ... I heard an aeroplane just after I passed through. A Bf 109 flew past.

Bader met Max Meyer in Sydney in 1981 during the Schofields Air Show. None of the German pilots who made a claim for an aerial victory that day could match their report with the demise of Bader's Spitfire. Adolf Galland, Geschwaderkommodore of JG 26, went through every report, even those of German pilots killed in the action, to determine Bader's victor. Each case was dismissed. Kosse's claim only matches the victory against No. 452 Squadron RAF's Sergeant Haydon.

More recently, in 2003 air historian Andy Saunders wrote a book Bader's Last Flight, following up with a Channel 4 documentary Who Downed Douglas Bader?, which first aired on 28 August 2006. Saunders' research now suggests that Bader may have been a victim of friendly fire, shot down by one of his fellow RAF pilots after becoming detached from his own squadron. RAF combat records indicate Bader may have been shot down by Flight Lieutenant "Buck" Casson of No. 616 Squadron RAF, who claimed a Bf 109 whose tail came off and the pilot baled out, before he himself was shot down and captured.

Casson also mentioned that for a while he watched as the pilot struggled to bale out. Bader was flying at the rear of the German fighter formation, alone, and his squadron were the opposite side of the Germans. "Buck" had only a few seconds in which he saw Bader and mistook his Spitfire for a Bf 109. In a letter to Bader on 28 May 1945, Casson explained the action. While this source made it into the public domain, it was severely edited. The nature of the letter, that it was from Casson to Bader, was removed. Crucially, an entire paragraph, which mentioned specifically the tail coming off "a Bf 109" and the pilot struggling to get out of the cockpit, was completely omitted from the original source, still in the Casson family's possession. Saunders stated that this was not absolute proof, and that it would be helpful to find the "Bader Spitfire".

==== Search for W3185 ====
The quest to find Bader's Spitfire, W3185, shed light on the demise of another famous wartime ace, Wilhelm Balthasar, Geschwaderkommodore of Jagdgeschwader 2 "Richthofen", who was killed in action on 3 July 1941 when his Bf 109F crashed into Ferme Goset, Wittes, France. It was recovered in March 2004. Later, in the summer 2004, a further aircraft was discovered in Widdebrouck. It was found to be that of a Bf 109F, flown by Unteroffizier Albert Schlager of JG 26, who was reported missing during Bader's last combat on 9 August 1941. A brief glimpse of hope was discovered later, when a Spitfire wreck was found. Inside was a flying helmet with the letters "DB" written on the top. It was later identified as a Spitfire IX, owing to the findings of a 20mm cannon (which Bader's Spitfire did not have), and ammunition dated as 1943.

Bader's aircraft was not found. It is likely that it came down at Mont Dupil Farm near the French village of Blaringhem, possibly near Desprez sawmill. A French witness, Jacques Taffin, saw the Spitfire disintegrating as it came down. He thought it had been hit by anti-aircraft fire, but none was active in the area. There were also no Spitfire remains in the area. The lack of any remains was not surprising, owing to the Spitfire breaking up on its descent. Historians have also been misled as to the whereabouts of the Spitfire because of a mistake in the book Reach for the Sky, in which Bader stated his leg had been dug out from the wreckage but was damaged, indicating a definite crash site. Bader's leg had actually been found in an open field.

=== Prisoner of war ===
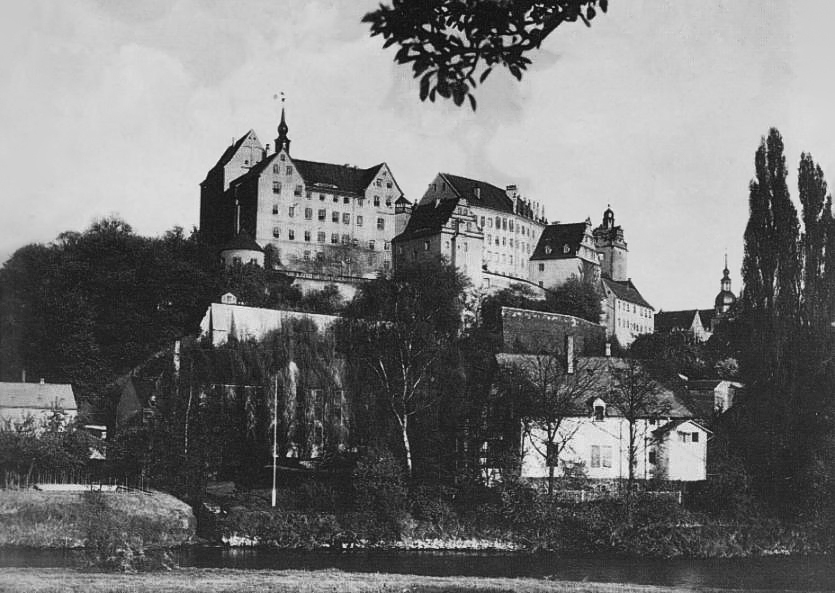
Colditz Castle in April 1945. Bader was a prisoner here for nearly three years

The Germans treated Bader with great respect. When Bader was taken prisoner, he was sent to a hospital in Saint-Omer, near the place where his father's grave is located. On leaving the hospital, Colonel Adolf Galland and his pilots invited him on to their airfield and they received him as a friend. Bader was cordially invited to sit in the cockpit of Galland's personal Bf 109. Bader asked Galland if it was possible to test the 109 by "a flight around the airfield". Galland laughingly refused.

Bader had lost a prosthetic leg when escaping his disabled aircraft. When he had baled out, his right prosthetic leg became trapped in the aircraft and he escaped only when the leg's retaining straps snapped after he pulled the ripcord on his parachute. Galland notified the British of his damaged leg and offered them safe passage to drop off a replacement. Hermann Göring himself gave the green light for the operation. The British responded on 19 August 1941 with the "Leg Operation"—an RAF bomber was allowed to drop a new prosthetic leg by parachute to St Omer, a Luftwaffe base in occupied France, as part of Circus 81 involving six Bristol Blenheims and a sizeable fighter escort including 452 Squadron.

The Germans were less impressed when, task done, the bombers proceeded on to their bombing mission to Gosnay Power Station near Bethune, although bad weather prevented the target being attacked. Galland stated in an interview that the aircraft dropped the leg after bombing Galland's airfield. Galland did not meet Bader again until mid-1945, when he, Günther Rall and Hans-Ulrich Rudel arrived at RAF Tangmere as prisoners of war. Bader, according to Rall, personally arranged for Rudel, a fellow amputee, to be fitted with an artificial leg.

Bader escaped from the hospital where he was recovering by tying together sheets. Initially the "rope" did not reach the ground; with the help of another patient, he slid the sheet from under the comatose New Zealand pilot, Bill Russell of No. 485 Squadron, who had had his arm amputated the day before. Russell's bed was then moved to the window to act as an anchor. A French maid at the St. Omer hospital attempted to get in touch with British agents to enable Bader to escape to Britain. She later brought a letter from a peasant couple (a Mr. and Mrs. Hiecques), who promised to shelter him outside St. Omer until he could be passed further down the line. Until then, their son would wait outside the hospital every night until there was a chance of escape. Eventually, he escaped out of a window. The plan worked initially. Bader completed the long walk to the safe house despite wearing a British uniform. Unfortunately for him, the plan was betrayed by another woman at the hospital. He hid in the garden when a German staff car arrived at the house, but was found later. Bader denied that the couple had known he was there. They, along with the French woman at the hospital, were sent for forced labour in Germany. The couple survived. After the war, French authorities sentenced the woman informer to 20 years in prison.

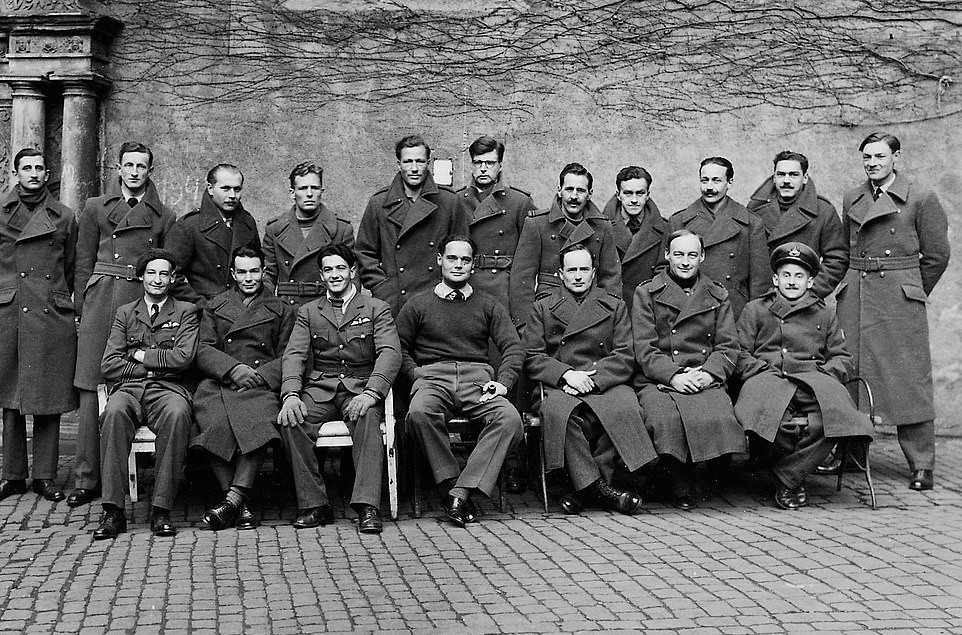
Bader sitting middle, with a mess in Colditz (Date: 1942-43). (Note: Image taken 1942 to 1943. Middleton (back row second from right) was transferred to Stalag Luft III in 1943. Bader, arrived in August 1942.)

Over the next few years, Bader made himself a thorn in the side of the Germans. He often practised what the RAF personnel called "goon-baiting". He considered it his duty to cause as much trouble to the enemy as possible, much of which included escape attempts. He made so many escape attempts that the Germans threatened to take away his legs.

On 15 February 1942, Bader was a prisoner held at the Warburg POW camp. Using his camp confederate Peter Tunstall's split-photo technique, Bader sneaked out a letter. He described conditions in the camp as 'bloody', the German rations as poor, and requested that future Red Cross parcels include concentrates of vitamins A, B, C, and D. Bader predicted that the German casualty rate on the Eastern front would "settle Germany in six months" and ended the letter with "Keep bombing these bastards to Hell."

In Warburg, the camp's chef security officer Rademacher liked enforcing harsh searches and long Appells. With regularity, he commanded the ferrets to storm a barrack and 'bastard search'. (Note: 'Bastard search': an unexpected search by guards to harass selected lags.) He also delayed Appells in the freezing cold. Lieutenant Hager was under the command of Major Rademacher. A common way for Hager and his cohorts to punish lags on searches or a long Appell was a rifle butt stroke to the face or the frozen foot. On 10 April 1942, Hager abused Bader. He whacked his wooden foot with a rifle butt. Bader laughed it off and insulted his efforts. Bader and Hager were both sent to the cooler as punishment. On 17 April 1942, Bader scolded Hager; he had failed to salute Bader, his superior in rank. The command punished Hager for not respecting rank and threw him and Bader in the cells once more.

In August 1942, Bader escaped with Johnny Palmer and three others from the camp at Stalag Luft III B in Sagan. Unluckily, a Luftwaffe officer of JG 26 was in the area. Keen to meet the Tangmere wing leader, he dropped by to see Bader, but when he knocked on his door there was no answer. Soon the alarm was raised, and a few days later, Bader was recaptured. During the escape attempt, the Germans produced a poster of Bader and Palmer asking for information. It described Bader's disability and said he "walks well with stick". Twenty years later, Bader was sent a copy of it by a Belgian civilian prisoner who had worked in a Gestapo office in Leipzig. Bader found this amusing as he had never used a stick.

He was finally dispatched to the "escape-proof" Colditz Castle Oflag IV-C on 16 August 1942. In May 1944 the Gestapo listed twenty per cent of the medical cases in the castle as deutschfeindlich (anti-German); because of this the Gestapo denied him medical repatriation. The list raised suspicion that the likes of Bader and many others would be the first in the castle to be tortured, or executed, if Hitler or the Gestapo made a justification.

=== Liberation ===
Bader remained at Colditz until 16 April 1945 when it was liberated by the First United States Army after a two-day fight with the defending Germans. Others had stopped goon-baiting but Bader continued to the end, which saved his life as an American shell destroyed his room. Lee Carson, an American journalist accompanying the army, went out of her way to find Bader and gain a personal account of the conditions within the castle. Bader departed the castle with Carson; he was in Paris the next day, and in Britain on the following day, returning home far earlier than other prisoners.

== Postwar ==
=== Last years in the RAF ===
After his return to Britain, Bader was given the honour of leading a victory flypast of 300 aircraft over London in June 1945. On 1 July, he was promoted to temporary wing commander. Soon after, Bader was looking for a post in the RAF. Air Marshal Richard Atcherley, a former Schneider Trophy pilot, was commanding the Central Fighter Establishment at Tangmere. He and Bader had been junior officers at Kenley in 1930, while serving in No. 23 Squadron RAF. Bader was given the post of the Fighter Leader's School commanding officer. He received a promotion to war substantive wing commander on 1 December and soon after was promoted to temporary group captain.

Unfortunately for Bader, the fighter aircraft's roles had now expanded significantly and he spent most of his time instructing on ground attack and co-operation with ground forces. Also, Bader did not get on with the newer generation of squadron leaders who considered him to be "out of date". In the end, Air Marshal James Robb offered Bader a role commanding the North Weald sector of No. 11 Group RAF, an organisation steeped in Fighter Command and Battle of Britain history. It is likely Bader would have stayed in the RAF for some time had his mentor Leigh-Mallory not been killed in an air crash in November 1944, such was the respect and influence he held over Bader. However, Bader's enthusiasm for continued service in the RAF had waned.

On 21 July 1946, Bader retired from the RAF with the rank of group captain to take a job at Royal Dutch Shell.

=== Postwar career ===
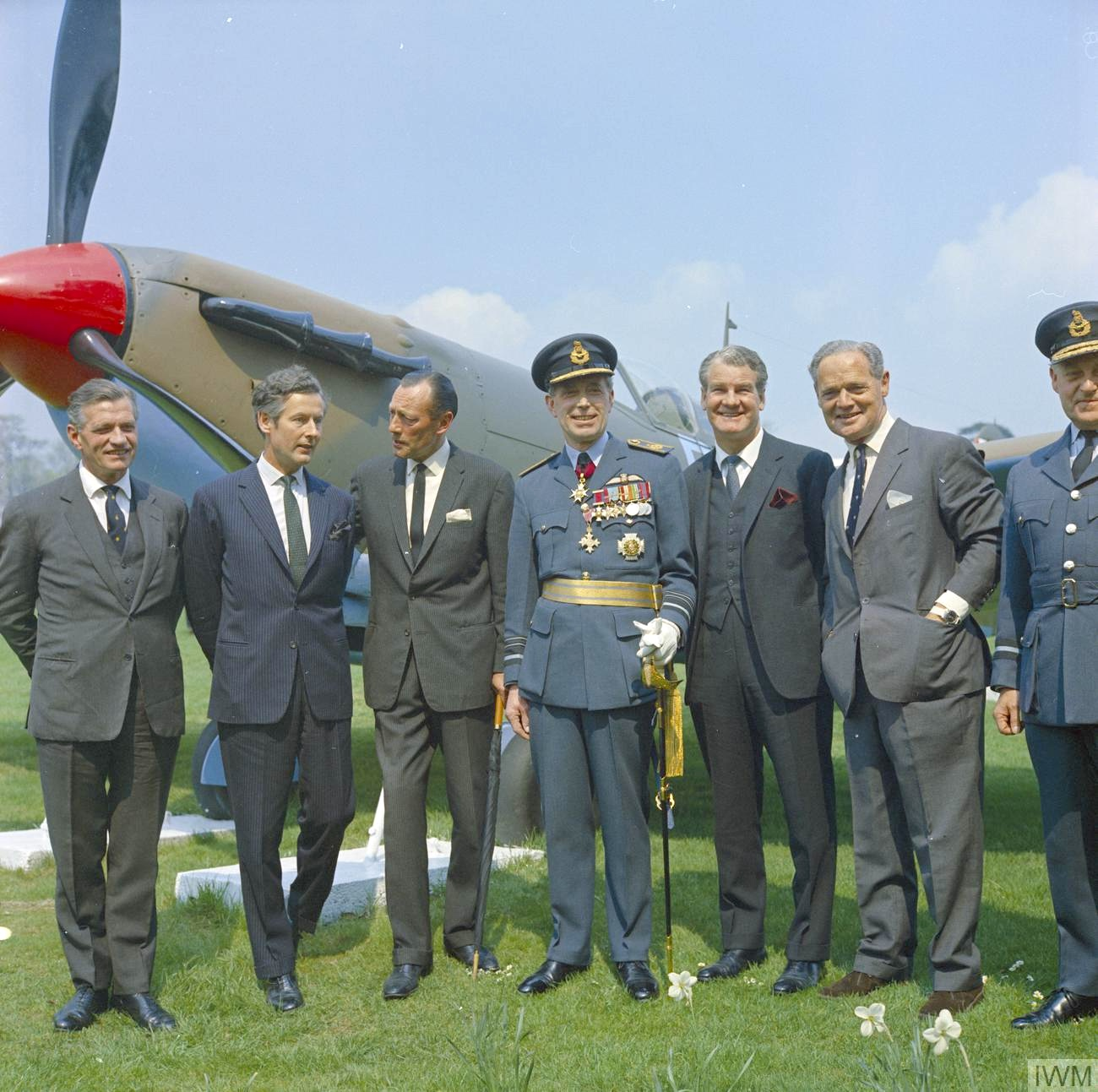
Bader in 1968 with several other World War II aces

Bader considered politics and standing as an MP for his home constituency. He despised how the three main political parties used war veterans for their own political ends. Instead, he resolved to join Shell. His decision was not motivated by money, but a willingness to repay a debt. Shell had been ready to take him on, aged 23, after his accident. Other companies had offered him more money, but he chose to join Shell on principle.

There was another incentive. Joining Shell would allow him to continue flying. He would travel as an executive, and it meant he could fly a light aircraft. He spent most of his time abroad flying around in a company-owned Percival Prince and later a Miles Gemini. On one mission, between 15 August and 16 September 1946, Bader was sent on a public relations mission for Shell around Europe and North Africa with United States Army Air Forces (USAAF) Lieutenant General James Doolittle, Doolittle having left active duty in January 1946 and returned to the Reserves.

Bader became managing director of Shell Aircraft until he retired in 1969. In that year he also served as a technical advisor to the film Battle of Britain. Bader travelled to every major country outside the Communist world, becoming internationally famous and a popular after-dinner speaker on aviation matters. In 1975 he spoke at the funeral of Air Chief Marshal Keith Park.

He also continued to attend re-unions at the RAF College at Cranwell, Lincolnshire. at which he had been trained when he entered the Royal Air Force.

=== Personality ===
When the film Reach for the Sky was released, people associated Bader with the quiet and amiable personality of actor Kenneth More, who played Bader.

Bader recognised that the producers had deleted all those habits he displayed when on operations, particularly his prolific use of bad language. Bader once said, "[they] still think [I'm] the dashing chap Kenneth More was".

Bader's more controversial traits were touched upon by Brickhill in the book Reach for the Sky. "He is a somewhat 'difficult' person", Brickhill told (Sir) Billy Collins, head of his publishing house William Collins and Sons, after spending over a year talking to him. Nevertheless, Bader was received as a legendary figure by the wider public, who closely identified him as a leader of The Few in the Battle of Britain.

Pete Tunstall, on first meeting Bader, recalled the force of his personality. Tunstall stated about Bader, "On first meeting Douglas Bader, one was forcibly struck by the power of his personality. Woe betide any young cock who thought he might share the roost." To Tunstall, Bader was not a normal specimen and it slightly unsettled him that people indignantly questioned his overbearing personality and then applied normal standards on to a man who had lost both his legs and yet came back to fly in the cockpit of wartime aircraft.

Never a person to hide his opinions, Bader also became controversial for his political viewpoints. A staunch conservative, his trenchantly expressed views on such subjects as juvenile delinquency, capital punishment, apartheid (which he was in favour of) and Rhodesia's defiance of the Commonwealth (he was a strong supporter of Ian Smith's white minority regime) attracted much criticism.

During the Suez Crisis, Bader travelled to New Zealand. Some of the more recent African countries to join the Commonwealth had been critical of the decision to intervene in Egypt; he replied that they could "bloody well climb back up their trees".

During a trip to South Africa in November 1965, Bader said that if he had been in Rhodesia when it made its declaration of independence, he "would have had serious thoughts about changing my citizenship."

Later, Bader also wrote the foreword to Hans-Ulrich Rudel's biography Stuka Pilot. Even when it emerged that Rudel was a fervent supporter of the Nazi Party, Bader said that prior knowledge would not have changed his mind about his contribution.

In the late 1960s, Bader was interviewed on television, where his comments provoked controversy. During the interview, he expressed a desire to be Prime Minister, and listed some controversial proposals should the opportunity ever arise:

- Withdraw sanctions from Rhodesia so negotiations could take place without pressure.
- Stop immigration into Britain immediately until the "situation had been examined".
- Reintroduce the death penalty for murder.
- Ban betting shops, "They breed protection rackets. That's why we're getting like Chicago in the '20s".

Bader was known, at times, to be head-strong, blunt and unsophisticated when he made his opinion known.

During one visit to Munich, as a guest of Adolf Galland, he walked into a room full of ex-Luftwaffe pilots and said, "My God, I had no idea we left so many of you bastards alive".

He also used the phrase to describe the Trades Union Congress during economic and social unrest in the 1970s. Later, he suggested that Britons in support of the Campaign for Nuclear Disarmament were a "rabble" and should be deported.

Author and journalist Ben Macintyre, who chronicled Bader's incarceration in a 2022 book on Colditz, described Bader as "a supremely brave man but he was also a monster: arrogant, domineering, selfish and spectacularly rude. Although most of his contemporaries admired him, many also loathed him." Macintyre reports that Bader never thanked his prisoner orderly Alex Ross, who tasks included "cooking and cleaning for the irascible RAF officer and carrying him up and down two flights of stairs every day for his bath," and never shared his superior rations with him. When Ross was selected for repatriation in 1943, Bader refused to let him leave Colditz and said "You came here as my lackey and you will stay with me as my lackey until we are both liberated."

=== Personal life ===
Bader's first wife, Thelma, developed throat cancer in 1967. Aware that her survival was unlikely, the two spent as much time with each other as possible. Thelma was a smoker, and although she stopped smoking, it did not save her. After a long illness, Thelma died on 24 January 1971, aged 64.

On 3 January 1973, Bader married Joan Murray (née Hipkiss); the couple were to spend the rest of their lives in the village of Marlston, Berkshire. Joan was the daughter of a steel tycoon. She had an interest in riding and was a member of the British Limbless Ex-Servicemen's Association. They first met at one of the association's events in 1960. She also helped associations involved in riding for disabled people.

Bader campaigned vigorously for people with disabilities and set an example of how one could thrive with a disability. In June 1976, Bader was knighted for his services to disabled people. Actor John Mills and Air Vice-Marshal Neil Cameron were also knighted at the ceremony.

Other awards followed. Bader maintained his interest in aviation, and in 1977 he was made a fellow of the Royal Aeronautical Society. He also received a Doctorate of Science from Queen's University Belfast. Bader was also busy acting as a consultant to Aircraft Equipment International at Ascot, Berkshire. Bader's health was in decline in the 1970s, and he soon gave up flying altogether. On 4 June 1979, Bader flew his Beech 95 Travelair (Note: Galland had bought one as well.) for the last time, the aircraft having been gifted to him on his retirement from Shell. He had recorded 5,744 hours and 25 minutes flying time. Bader's friend Adolf Galland followed Bader into retirement soon afterwards for the same reasons.

His workload was exhausting for a legless man with a worsening heart condition. On 5 September 1982, after a dinner honouring Marshal of the Royal Air Force Sir Arthur "Bomber" Harris at the Guildhall, at which he spoke, Bader died of a heart attack while being driven through Chiswick, west London, on his way home.

Among the many dignitaries and personalities at his funeral was Adolf Galland. Galland and Bader had shared a friendship that spanned more than 40 years since their first meeting in France. Although Galland was on a business trip to California, he made sure to attend the memorial service held for Bader at the St Clement Danes Church in the Strand. Peter Tory wrote in his "London Diary" newspaper column:

Certainly Bader, had he been present, would have instantly recognised the stranger in the dark raincoat. Stomping over to his side, he would have banged him on the back and bellowed: "Bloody good show, glad you could come!"

— Peter Tory

=== Tributes ===
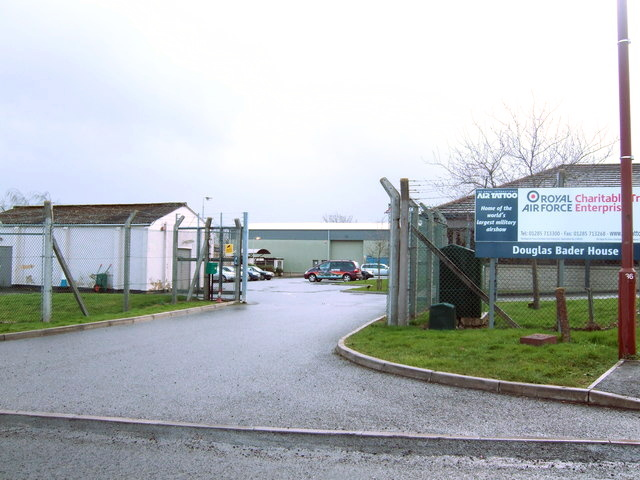
Douglas Bader House in Fairford is now the headquarters for the RAF Charitable Trust

A biography of Bader by Paul Brickhill, Reach for the Sky, was published in 1954. Some 172,000 copies were sold in the first few months alone. The initial print run of 300,000 quickly sold out, as the biography became the biggest-selling hardback in postwar Britain. Brickhill had originally offered Bader fifty per cent of all proceeds, sealing the arrangement with a handshake.

As sales soared, Bader became concerned that, after tax, he would make very little, and he insisted on a new deal, in writing. So, Brickhill agreed to make him a one-off payment from his company Brickhill Publications Limited of £13,125, the majority of which would be for 'expenses', and tax-free, with only a small portion for 'services' and therefore taxable (£237,679 today). The Inland Revenue subsequently waived any tax liabilities on Bader's earnings.

After film director Daniel M. Angel bought the film rights and teamed up with Lewis Gilbert to write the screenplay, Bader came to regret the limiting new deal he had wrung from Brickhill. He was so bitter, he refused to attend the premiere, and only saw the film eleven years later, on television. He never spoke to Brickhill again, and never answered his letters. The feature film of the same title was released in 1956, starring Kenneth More as Bader, topping the box office in Britain that year.

An animated cameo of Bader, voiced by Charles Shaugnessy, was seen in the Season Two Episode "MIA" of Disney's Gargoyles. Having met Bader before he died, Greg Weisman wanted to pay his respects by having him assist and be assisted by the titular creatures whilst dogfighting with the Luftwaffe over London during the Battle of Britain.

On the 60th anniversary of Bader's last combat sortie, his widow Joan unveiled a statue at Goodwood, formerly RAF Westhampnett, the aerodrome from which he took off. The 6 ft (1.8 m) bronze sculpture, the first such tribute, was created by Kenneth Potts and was commissioned by the Earl of March, who runs the Goodwood estate.

The Douglas Bader Foundation was formed in honour of Bader in 1982 by family and friends—many also former RAF pilots who had flown with Bader during the Second World War. One of Bader's artificial legs is kept by the RAF Museum at their warehouse in Stafford, and is not on public display.

He was the subject of This Is Your Life in 1982 when he was surprised by Eamonn Andrews during a reception on the Martini Terrace of New Zealand House in London's Haymarket.

The Northbrook College Sussex campus at Shoreham Airport has a building named after him in which aeronautical and automotive engineering are taught. The building was opened by his wife Joan Murray.

Sir Douglas Bader Towers in Edmonton is a 13-story residential building with 79 units, constructed in 1978. The building was developed in part by Larry Pempeit, who also played a key role in creating housing options for people with disabilities in Edmonton, Alberta, Canada.

The Bader Way, in Woodley, Reading is named after Bader. Woodley Airfield, now redeveloped but housing the Museum of Berkshire Aviation, is where Bader lost his legs in a flying accident in 1931.

Bader Road, in Poole, Dorset, is a road on a housing estate where all the roads are named after WW2 fighter pilots, and is named after Bader.

Bader Walk (previously Douglas Bader Walk but renamed following public consternation) in Birmingham.

Amongst other aircraft-related street names in Apley, Telford, Shropshire, is a Bader Close.

A pub at Martlesham Heath, Suffolk, is named after Bader. From 1981 to 2012 there was a pub in Tangmere close to the airfield named The Bader Arms, subsequently a Co-op Supermarket.

RAF Coltishall, sold off by the MoD, was purchased privately in 2006 and later renamed Badersfield.

Heyford Park Free School Upper Heyford which is located on the former RAF Station Upper Heyford US Air Force airfield has honoured Bader by using his name for one of the school's houses. The tie stripe representing Bader is blue. The other houses are red and yellow. Those houses are named after McGuire and Lindh, two US Air Force pilots who sacrificed themselves when their planes crashed in a nearby village in 1992.

Bader Drive near Auckland International Airport in Auckland, New Zealand was named in Bader's honour. Bader Intermediate School (Year 7 and 8) near Bader Drive in Mangere, Auckland, New Zealand.

Film production company Bader Media Entertainment CIC is named after Bader; its logo depicts a pipe and feather.

The Douglas Bader Rehabilitation Unit at Queen Mary's Hospital, Roehampton, London, a world-renowned limb fitting and amputee rehabilitation centre, is named after him. It was opened by Diana, Princess of Wales in 1993.

In 2020 a special school, named the Bader Academy, was opened in the City of Doncaster. The Academy logo features a plane along with the strapline "where dreams take flight".

The Royal Air Force Air Cadets "RAFAC Bader" is the organisations main management system, used by both Staff and Cadets. Initially named "Project Bader", it was officially used in cadet service in January 2020, with its sister "Bader Learn" replacing the previously used "Ultilearn" for cadets.

== Honours and awards ==
- 1 October 1940 – Acting Squadron Leader Bader (26151) is appointed a Companion of the Distinguished Service Order:

This officer had displayed, gallantry and leadership of the highest order. During three recent engagements he has led his squadron with such skill and ability that thirty-three enemy aircraft have been destroyed. In the course of these engagements Squadron Leader Bader had added to his previous successes by destroying six enemy aircraft

— London Gazette
- 7 January 1941 – Acting Squadron Leader Bader, DSO (26151), No. 242 Squadron is awarded the Distinguished Flying Cross:

Squadron Leader Bader has continued to lead his squadron and wing with the utmost gallantry on all occasions. He has now destroyed a total of ten hostile aircraft and damaged several more.

— London Gazette
- 15 July 1941 – Acting Wing Commander Bader, DSO, DFC (26151) is awarded a bar to the Distinguished Service Order:

This officer has led his wing on a series of consistently successful sorties over enemy territory during the past three months. His high qualities of leadership and courage have been an inspiration to all. Wing Commander Bader has destroyed 15 hostile aircraft.

— London Gazette
- 9 September 1941 – Acting Wing Commander Bader, DSO, DFC (26151) is awarded a bar to the Distinguished Flying Cross in recognition of gallantry displayed in flying operations against the enemy:

The fearless pilot has recently added a further four enemy aircraft to his previous successes; in addition he has probably destroyed another four and damaged five hostile aircraft. By his fine leadership and high courage Wing Commander Bader has inspired the wing on every occasion.

— London Gazette
- 2 January 1956 – Group Captain Bader, DSO, DFC is appointed a Commander of the Most Excellent Order of the British Empire for services to disabled people.
- 12 June 1976 – Group Captain Bader, CBE, DSO, DFC is made a Knight Bachelor for services to disabled people.

== Combat credos ==
Bader attributed his success to the belief in the three basic rules, shared by the German ace Erich Hartmann:

- "If you had the height, you controlled the battle."
- "If you came out of the sun, the enemy could not see you."
- "If you held your fire until you were very close, you seldom missed."

== See also ==
- Gheorghe Bănciulescu, a Romanian aviator, the first pilot in the world to fly with his feet amputated
- Alexey Maresyev, a Soviet Second World War fighter ace with amputated legs
- James MacLachlan, a British Second World War fighter ace with an amputated arm
- Hans-Ulrich Rudel, a Second World War German pilot who continued flying after having a leg amputated
- A detailed account of a remarkably similar case in India: Clambering Back Into a Cockpit with Only One Leg – India's Own Douglas Bader (IAFHistory.in) — This article narrates the story of Lieut. Uday Sondhi, an Indian Navy fighter pilot who, after losing a leg in a jet crash, successfully returned to operational flying duties on frontline aircraft, the Chetak helicopter. Drawing comparisons with Bader's legacy, the piece highlights the pilot's medical clearance from the Institute of Aerospace Medicine, custom prosthesis from Pune's Artificial Limb Centre, and eventual gallantry decoration with the Shaurya Chakra. Published on a respected Indian military aviation history blog.
