= Anthony Eyre (RAF officer) =

British WWII flying ace (1918–1946)

- Born: 12 November 1918; Lowestoft, Suffolk, England
- Died: 16 February 1946 (aged 27); Llancadle Farm, Aberthaw, Wales
- Burial place: St. Cennydd’s Churchyard, Llangennith, Wales
- Military career
- Allegiance: United Kingdom
- Branch: Royal Air Force
- Service years: 1938–1947
- Rank: Wing commander
- Commands: North Weald Fighter Wing; No. 615 Squadron
- Conflicts: Second World War: Battle of France; Battle of Britain; Circus offensive
- Awards: Distinguished Flying Cross

Anthony Eyre, DFC (12 November 1918 – 16 February 1946) was a British flying ace who served with the Royal Air Force (RAF) during the Second World War. He was credited with having shot down at least ten aircraft.

Born in Lowestoft, Eyre was studying law when he joined the Royal Auxiliary Air Force in 1938. He was called up for service in the RAF on the outbreak of the Second World War, serving with No. 615 Squadron. The squadron was sent to France in the early stages of the war and following the German invasion in May 1940, Eyre claimed his first aerial victories. He flew extensively through the Battle of Britain until the squadron was rested, by which time he had been awarded the Distinguished Flying Cross. He commanded the unit briefly in 1941 until he was taken off operations. He returned to duty in March 1942 as the wing leader of the North Weald Fighter Wing but was shot down over France on his first sortie leading the unit. He spent the remainder of the war as a prisoner of war. After the end of hostilities in Europe, he remained in the RAF. He was killed in a flying accident on 16 February 1946.

== Early life ==
Anthony Eyre was born on 12 November 1918 in Lowestoft, Suffolk, in England. He went to school in Croydon, being educated at Whitgift School, as his father worked at a bank in Purley. Once his education was completed, in 1935 he commenced working for the National Provincial Bank in London.

In 1938 Eyre joined the Royal Auxiliary Air Force, being commissioned as a pilot officer and serving with No. 615 Squadron. Based at Kenley, this was initially an Army-cooperation squadron using Hawker Hectors but towards the end of 1938, it was transferred to Fighter Command and began to operate Gloster Gauntlet fighters. The following year, the squadron converted to the Gloster Gladiator fighter.

== Second World War ==
In late-August 1939, just before the outbreak of the Second World War, Eyre was called up for service with the Royal Air Force (RAF). No. 615 Squadron at this time was on a war footing at Croydon. It received upgraded Gladiators and in November was sent to France with the RAF component of the British Expeditionary Force. It served, firstly at Merville and then Vitry, alongside No. 607 Squadron as part of No. 60 Wing. While Eyre and the squadron saw little activity for the next few months, during this time he was promoted to flying officer. In April 1940, the squadron began reequipping with Hawker Hurricane fighters.

=== Battle of France ===
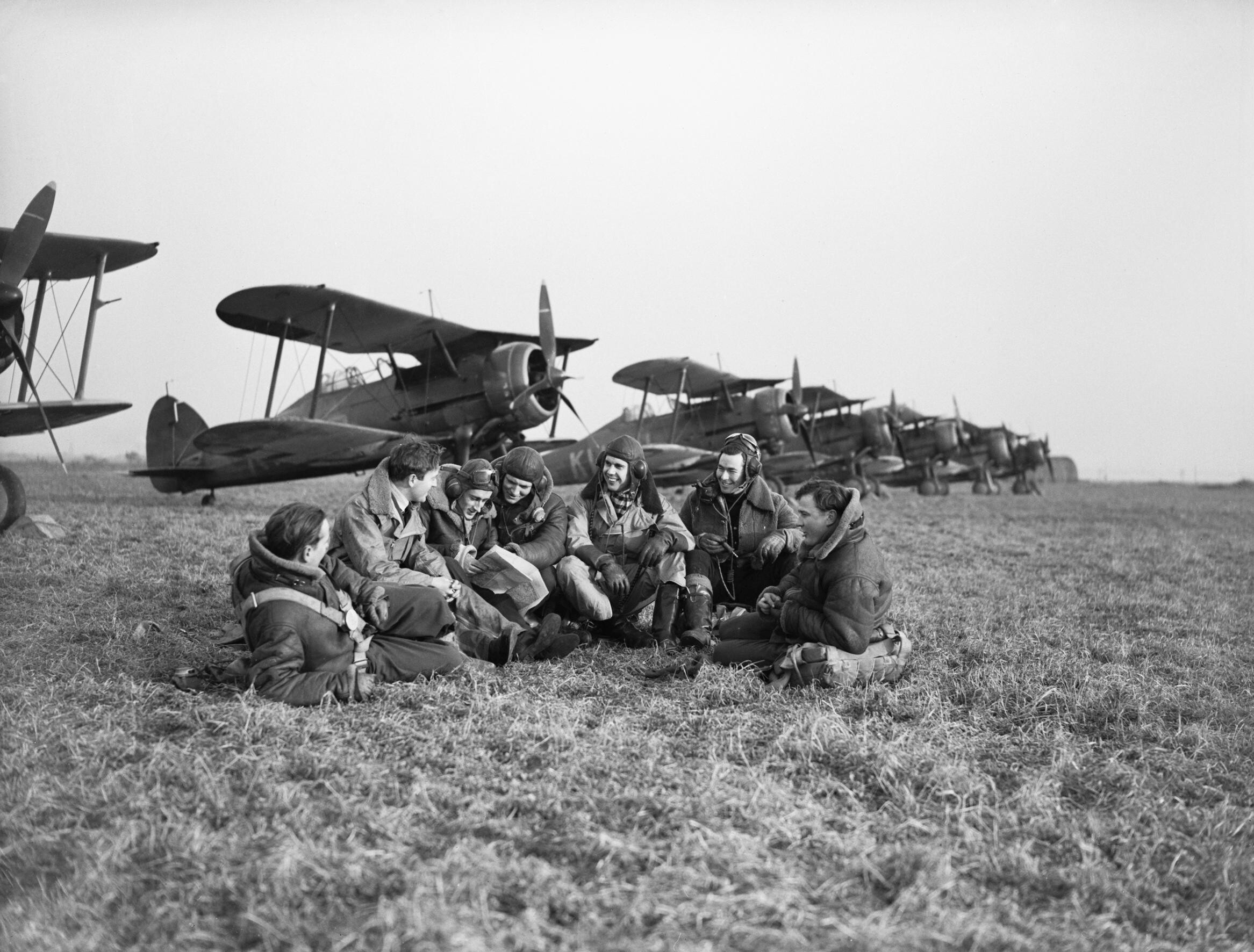
Pilots of No. 615 Squadron in front of their Gloster Gladiator fighters at Vitry, in France

When the Germans invaded France and the Low Countries in May, No. 615 Squadron was extensively engaged in patrols and bomber escort missions. During this time Eyre often flew courier sorties, delivering communications between France and England using one of the remaining Gladiators, which had been retained for defensive operations. On 19 May Eyre, flying a Hurricane, claimed two Messerschmitt Bf 109 fighters as shot down, but these were unable to be confirmed. The next day he flew a Gladiator back to Kenley; the squadron, ordered to evacuate France, followed him on 20 May.

After a period of recovery, No. 615 Squadron returned to offensive operations, flying to France on bomber escort missions in aid of the elements of the BEF still remaining in France after Operation Dynamo. On 11 June Eyre, while escorting Bristol Blenheim light bombers that were attacked by Luftwaffe fighters, destroyed a Bf 109 near Fécamp, and also damaged what he claimed was a Messerschmitt Bf 110 heavy fighter but was probably a Dornier Do 17 medium bomber. He shot down a Bf 110 on 22 June with three more damaged 5 miles (8.0 km) to the east of Rouen.

=== Battle of Britain ===
During July, No. 615 Squadron was operating over the English Channel, protecting shipping convoys, and on 20 July, to the east of Dover, Eyre destroyed one Bf 109 and damaged a second. The following month the squadron was drawn into the aerial fighting over southern England and on 14 August, Eyre destroyed two Junkers Ju 87 dive bombers near the Folkestone lightship, one being shared with another pilot. The following day he shared in the destruction of a Bf 109 to the southeast of Folkestone. On 20 August, he shot down a Do 17 over Herne Bay.

On 26 August Eyre shot down a Bf 109 over the Thames estuary, also claiming a second as probably destroyed. The same day, he engaged and destroyed a Junkers Ju 88 medium bomber over Portsmouth. Two days later he shot down a Do 17 near Sandwich, and also claimed a Bf 109 as probably destroyed and damaged another. At the end of the month, he was recognised for his successes with an award of the Distinguished Flying Cross (DFC). The citation, published in The London Gazette, read:

This officer has shot down seven enemy aircraft, and inflicted damage on several others. Whilst on service in France, he showed eagerness to fly on all occasions and during the winter his flying times exceeded fifty hours monthly. During the evacuation from France, Flying Officer Eyre was entrusted with an important message from England to France and successfully completed this mission, which required great coolness and presence of mind. He has at all times shown great devotion to duty.

— London Gazette, No. 34958, 30 August 1940

By the time of Eyre's award of the DFC, No. 615 Squadron had been sent north to Prestwick for a rest. The next few weeks were spent training its pilots but in October the squadron went south to Northolt, and was involved in defending the tail end of the Luftwaffe's campaign against the south of England. Eyre was promoted to acting flight lieutenant at this time and appointed commander of one of the squadron's flights. His flight lieutenant rank was made substantive early the following year.

=== Circus offensive ===
In February 1941, No. 615 Squadron, now using the Hurricane Mk II and operating from Kenley, switched to the offensive, being involved in the RAF's Circus offensive to France. At the end of the month Eyre was appointed commander of the squadron, due to the incumbent being killed in action. He remained in the post until April, when he was rested from operations.

After serving in a staff role at the headquarters of No. 9 Group at Preston for several months, Eyre was promoted to squadron leader at the end of the year. He was made an acting wing commander and appointed wing leader of the North Weald Fighter Wing in early March 1942. On his first sortie to France as wing leader, carried out on 8 March, his Spitfire was damaged in an engagement with a Focke-Wulf Fw 190 fighter, and he had to make an emergency landing at Mardyck. He spent the duration of the war as a prisoner of war, being held much of the time at Stalag Luft III camp.

== Postwar period ==
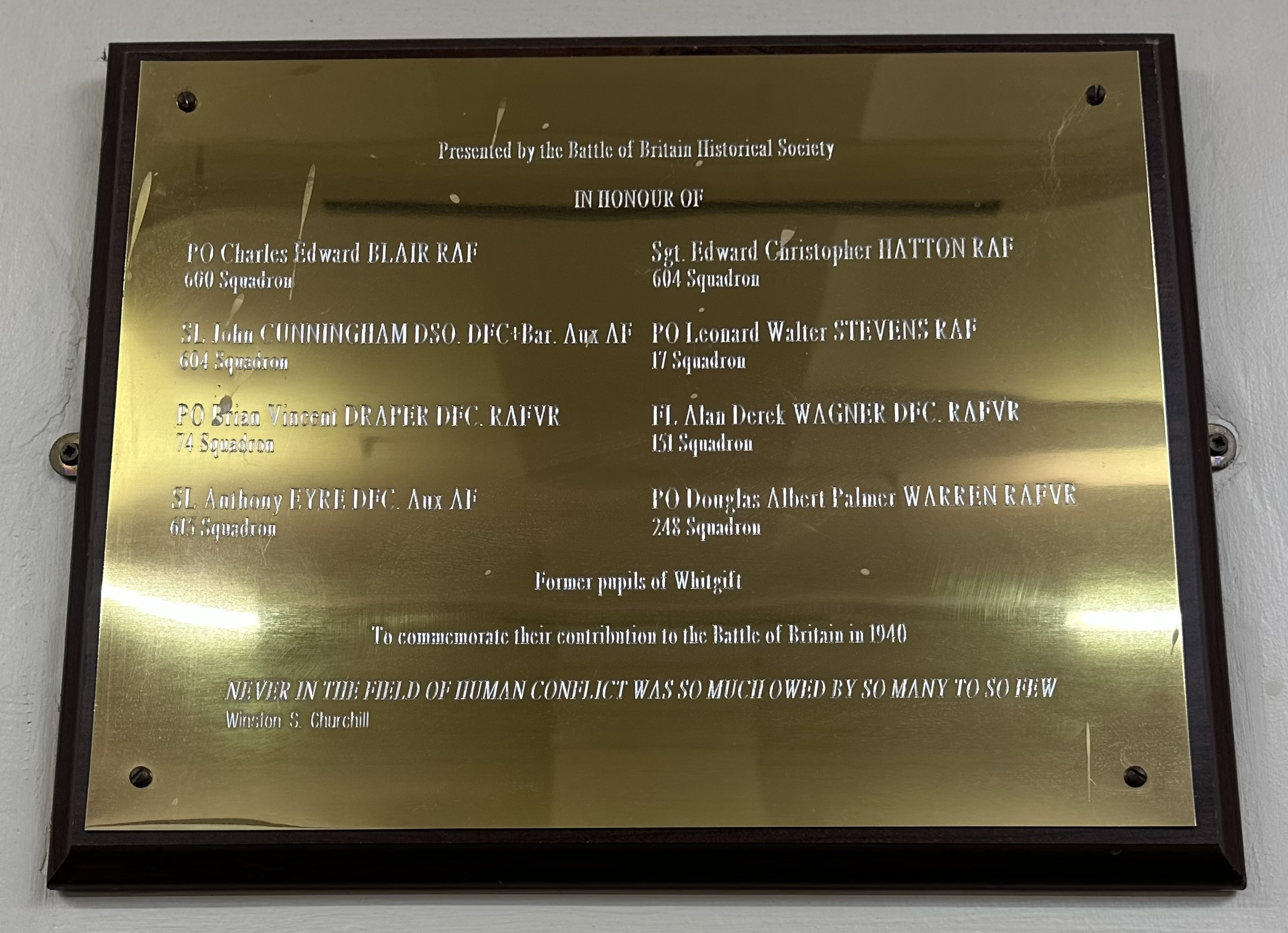
Plaque memorial with Eyre's name, at Whitgift School, Croydon

Eyre remained in the RAF following his release from captivity in May 1945, and was appointed the commander of the RAF station at Fairwood Common in Wales. On 16 February 1946, he took a Hawker Tempest fighter for a flight, during which engine trouble was experienced. Eyre attempted to make an emergency landing at the airfield at St Athan but the engine failed entirely as he maneuvered into the flight path for landing there. The Tempest crashed into a tree on Llancadle Farm, close to Aberthaw, killing Eyre.

Eyre is buried at St. Cennydd's Churchyard at Llangennith in Wales. He was credited with having shot down ten aircraft, two of which being shared with other pilots. In addition to two aircraft probably destroyed, he is also credited with six damaged while two aerial victories were unconfirmed.

In 2006, Eyre's former school, Whitgift School, unveiled a memorial plaque to commemorate eight former students, Eyre among them, who had flown in the Battle of Britain.
