= Goon baiting =

Attempts by prisoners of war to antagonize guards

Goon-baiting is an interaction between the prisoner and the guard, or an oppressor, whereby the prisoner, aiming to ensure he is not endangered, 'plays mind games, or does actions, to confuse or enrage an oppressor to the point of where he'd lose his composure.' Goon-baiting was a term used in World War II.

In WWII, in prisoner-of-war camps, goon-baiting was used amongst prisoners of all nationalities. The aim of goon-baiting was to achieve maximum impact without endangering yourself. Not all prisoners participated in goon-baiting, some thinking it bad manners and others thinking it gave any oppressor an opportunity or more of a reason to retaliate, thereby only bringing with it more suffering.

Examples of goon-baiting include one prisoner deliberately being counted more than once during Appell in order to cover for a missing comrade or sow confusion, exaggerated salutes, or French prisoners singing banned songs without moving their lips at Appell.

== Etymology ==
Some claim the roots of the term 'goon' come from a 1930s cartoon character called Alice the Goon, and people also used the term goon to describe an incompetent professional bully. Pete Tunstall claims a fellow prisoner called Bill Fowler was the first to ever coin the term amongst the prisoners and that Fowler referenced a well-known comic strip.

The phrase 'goon bait' has a different usage as modern internet slang for something designed to cause sexual arousal, similar to a thirst trap.

== See also ==
- Milgram experiment
- Military slang
- RAF slang
- Stanford prison experiment
- Taking the mick
- Taunting

== Sources ==
- Jay, John (2014). Facing Fearful Odds. United Kingdom: Pen and Sword. ISBN 9781473827349.
- Tunstall, Peter (2014). The Last Escaper. London, UK: Duckworth. ISBN 978-0-71564-923-7.
- Reid, Pat Robert., Lippincott, 1953. 288 pages.
- Vercoe, Tony (2006). Survival at Stalag IVB. United Kingdom: McFarland. ISBN 9780786424047.
- Wilson, Patrick (11 September 2000). The War Behind the Wire. United Kingdom: Pen and Sword. ISBN 9780850527452.
