= Joseph Kayll =

Joseph Robert Kayll
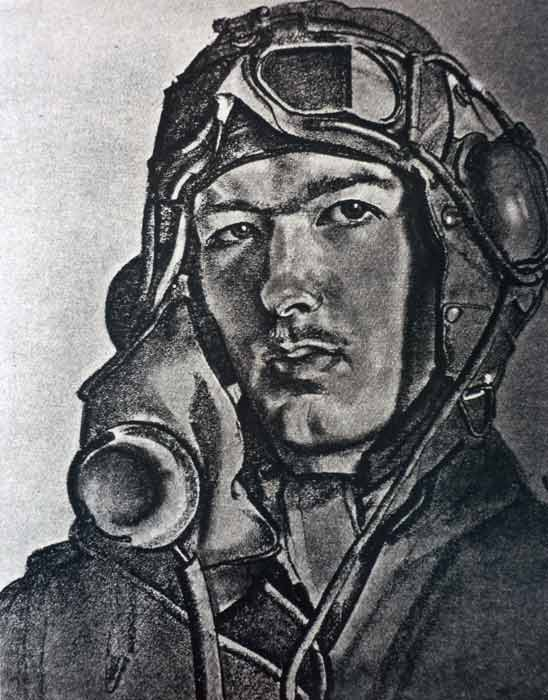
- Portrait of Kyall, made by official war artist Eric Kennington in 1941
- Born: 12 April 1914; Sunderland, England
- Died: 3 March 2000 (aged 85); Sunderland, England
- Military career
- Allegiance: United Kingdom
- Branch: Royal Air Force
- Rank: Wing commander
- Nickname: Joe
- Commands: No. 607 Squadron (1946–49); Hornchurch Wing (1941); No. 615 Squadron (1940)
- Conflicts: Second World War: Battle of France; Battle of Britain
- Awards: Distinguished Service Order; Officer of the Order of the British Empire; Distinguished Flying Cross; Air Efficiency Award; Mentioned in dispatches
- Other work: Justice of the Peace; Deputy Lieutenant of Durham

Joseph Kayll, DSO, OBE, DFC, AE, DL (12 April 1914 – 3 March 2000) was a Royal Air Force fighter pilot and flying ace of the Second World War.

== Early life ==
Joseph Robert Kayll was born on 12 April 1914 at Sunderland, in England. He went to school in Yorkshire, being educated at Aysgarth School before going onto Stowe School. He was academically unsuccessful, and left school when he was 16, taking up work at a saw milling facility. He joined the Auxiliary Air Force in 1934, serving with No. 607 (County of Durham) Squadron and rising to become a flight lieutenant.

== Second World War ==
Following the outbreak of the war he volunteered for full-time service and fought in France in early 1940 before taking part in the Battle of Britain, commanding No. 615 (County of Surrey) Squadron as an acting squadron leader. During the Battle of Britain Kayll was credited with shooting down seven German aircraft with one shared and six unconfirmed destroyed, along with six damaged. For these efforts he was awarded the Distinguished Service Order and Distinguished Flying Cross, which were personally presented by King George VI.

In late 1940, Kayall was rested from operations and posted to the headquarters of Fighter Command. In the 1941 New Year Honours, he was mentioned in dispatches. In June he was promoted to wing commander and given command of the Hornchurch wing of three Spitfire squadrons. He was shot down over France the following month.

=== Prisoner of war ===
Captured by the Germans, Kayall became a prisoner of war and was initially held at Oflag IX-A/H at Spangenberg. He assisted in facilitating two escapes made by other prisoners before being moved to Oflag VI-B near Warburg in October. Kayll escaped in a mass break out in September 1942 and with a companion travelled by foot 90 kilometres before being recaptured south of Fulda. He was transferred to Stalag Luft III at Sagan in May 1943, and was in charge of the Escape Committee for the East Compound. He remained in captivity for the remainder of the war, co-ordinating numerous escape attempts, for which he was later appointed an Officer of the Order of the British Empire in 1946. The published citation read:

Wing Commander Kayll was shot down near St. Omer in July 1941 and captured immediately. He became S.B.O. at Oflag IX A/H until moved to Warburg in October 1941. In September 1942, Wing Commander Kayll escaped in a mass break out and, with a companion, walked south for seven days, covering 90 Km. before being recaptured by a forester, south of Fulda. He was transferred to Stalag Luft III (Sagan) in May 1943, and was in charge of the Escape Committee for the East Compound. Escape activities involved a very high proportion of the camp, and its direction was both arduous and dangerous, but Wing Commander Kayll was unsparing in his efforts to carry out this work. He also organised the whole of the security and intelligence section.

— London Gazette, No. 37666, 26 July 1946"No. 37666". The London Gazette (Supplement). 23 July 1946. p. 3833.

== Later life ==
After the war Kyall continued to serve, rejoining the Royal Auxiliary Air Force and commanding No. 607 (County of Durham) Squadron.

In civilian life he served as a justice of the peace and as Deputy Lieutenant of Durham. He died on 3 March 2000.

== See also ==
- List of Deputy Lieutenants of Durham
- List of RAF aircrew in the Battle of Britain
- List of World War II aces from the United Kingdom
