= Moorsele Airfield =

Moorsele Airfield Vliegveld Moorsele
- IATA: none; ICAO: EBMO

Summary
- Airport type: Private
- Operator: Vliegveld Moorsele VZW
- Location: Moorsele, Belgium
- Elevation AMSL: 57 ft / 17 m
- Coordinates: 50°51′10″N 003°08′50″E

Map
- Location in Belgium

Runways
Direction	Length		Surface
Direction	m	ft	Surface
04/22	670	2,198	Grass
- Sources: Belgian AIP

Moorsele Airfield (ICAO: EBMO) is a recreational airfield located in Moorsele, a village in the municipality of Wevelgem in Belgium. It is operated by Vliegveld Moorsele VZW and was formerly operated by the Belgian Air Component. It is mainly used as a light general aviation field for ULM and parachuting activities.

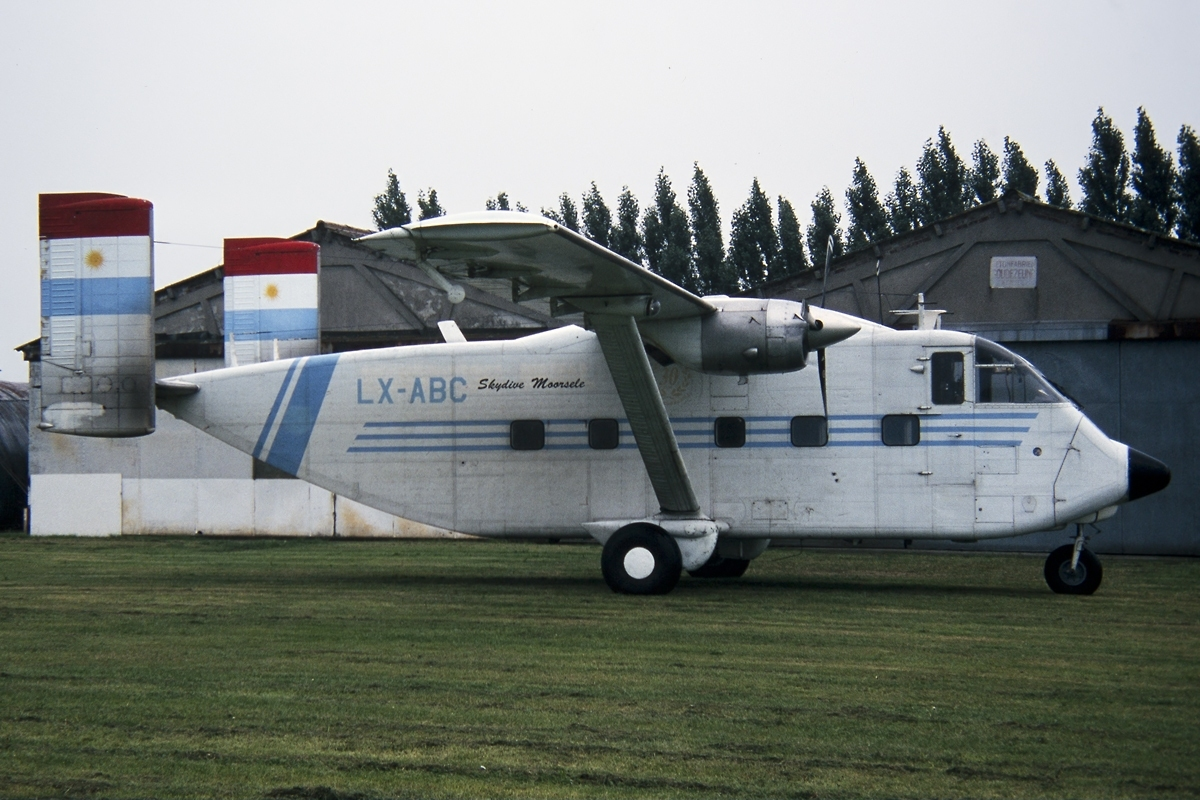
A Short Skyvan at Moorsele

== See also ==
- List of airports in Belgium
