= Pete Tunstall =

RAF Pilot and Colditz escapee (1918–2013)

- Born: Peter David Tunstall; 1 December 1918; Chadwell St Mary, England
- Died: 27 July 2013 (aged 94); South Africa
- Military career
- Allegiance: United Kingdom
- Branch: Royal Air Force
- Service years: 1937–1958
- Rank: Squadron Leader
- Conflicts: World War II: Battle of France

Peter David Tunstall (1 December 1918 – 27 July 2013) was a squadron leader in the Royal Air Force during the Second World War and a prisoner of war (POW) held at Colditz Castle. He holds the record for the most time spent by an Allied POW in solitary confinement.

== Early life ==
Tunstall was born in Chadwell St Mary, Essex, in 1918 and moved to the nearby village of Orsett at the age of three. As a schoolboy he took his first flying lesson from a local airfield, paid for by shooting and selling rabbits to his local butcher. He joined the RAF in 1937 and trained at No 61 Squadron at Hemswell in Lincolnshire and eventually became a Hampden pilot.

During his RAF training he was told by A.J. Evans – a World War I Royal Flying Corps pilot and double prisoner-of-war escapee – that if he was captured, "Your first duty was to try to escape. Your second duty was to be as big a bloody nuisance as possible to the enemy." Tunstall took the advice to heart.

== Second World War ==
Tunstall flew combat missions over France during and after the British retreat to Dunkirk. He was captured on the night of 26/27 August 1940, when, due to a wireless failure, his aircraft became lost and crash-landed on the Dutch coast. He was captured and initially sent to a POW camp in Poland. After trying to escape from the camp dressed as a German NCO, he was transferred to Spangenberg Castle. It was during his incarceration at Spangenberg Castle that Tunstall, along with Eustace Newborn and Dominic Bruce came up with the escape plan known as "the Swiss Commission". The escape attempt has gone down as one of the most audacious of the war. Using uniforms found in the castle and suits made from uniforms, the three POWs simply walked out of the camp during an inspection by the Swiss Red Cross. They spent ten days at large before being recaptured.

Tunstall was then moved to Oflag VIB, where he tried again to escape dressed as a German soldier. Following this attempt, he was shipped to Colditz Castle on 15 March 1942. Here Tunstall perfected his "goon-baiting" (activities to distract and annoy the German guards). At Colditz, he also developed methods of getting information back to Britain inside photographs and letters. At the end of the war, he was recommended for an award by MI9, but it was turned down by the Colonel Willie Tod, the senior British officer at Colditz.

Tunstall disputed some of the stories about Colditz. He confirmed his work with Escape Officers to cause diversions when an escape was "on", as well as pulling stunts and spoiling roll calls at other times. However, he did not agree that POWs threw "excrement" bombs or blew "raspberries" at the Germans.

Tunstall was liberated by American troops on 16 April 1945 and returned to Britain shortly afterwards.

== Post war ==
After the war, Tunstall continued to serve in the RAF until 1958 as a flying instructor on Meteor and Vampire jets. He also served at the Advanced Flying Training School (No. 5 FTS) at Oakington in Cambridgeshire as a chief flying instructor. After leaving the RAF, he joined Laker Airways before emigrating to South Africa, where he worked as an actor as well as continuing to fly. His autobiography, The Last Escaper, was published in 2014.

== Death ==
Tunstall died on 27 July 2013 at his home in South Africa.
