= List of attempts to escape Oflag IV-C =

Below is a list of attempts to escape from Oflag IV-C, the famous prisoner-of-war camp.

Color Key:
No color	Detected before escape
Green	Successful escape
Orange	Escaped but recaptured
Red	Injured/Killed during escape

== 1941 escape attempts ==
Date	Name	Nationality	Method	Result
March 18	Lt. B Cazaumayou; Lt. J Paillie	French	Tunnel	Detected
March ???	Flt. Lt. W. Gassowski; Flt. Lt. W. Gorecki	Polish	Cut bar in canteen	Detected
March ???	Lt. A. Boucheron; Lt. J. Charvet	French	Canteen window	Detected
April 5	Lt. J. Just; Lt. R. Bednarksi	Polish	Escaped from train en route to Königswartha Hospital	Recaptured; Kraków, Poland
April 11	Lt. A. Le Ray	French	He hid in a park during a game of football.	Successful Escape
April 25	Lt. K. Dokurno; Lt. P. Zielinski; Lt. S. Bartoszewicz	Polish	Ceiling above canteen	Detected
May 8	Lt. P. Allan	British	Escaped inside mattress	Recaptured; Vienna, Austria
May 8	Lt. J. Hyde-Thomson	British	Escaped inside mattress	Detected
May 9	Lt. M Chmiel; Lt. M. Surmanowicz	Polish	Hid in German quarters	Detected
May 10	Capt. P. Reid; Flt. Lt. H. Wardle	British	Tunnel	Detected
May 12	Lt. M. Chmiel; Lt. M. Surmanowicz	Polish	Bedsheet rope	Detected
May 13	Lt. J. Just	Polish	Escaped from solitary confinement	Recaptured; Rhine river
May 17	Lt. C. Moura; Lt. R. Boutellier	French	Over roof of kitchen house	Detected
May 20	Lt. J. Just	Polish	Escaped from Villingen Hospital	Recaptured; Württemberg
May 29	Lt. Col. G. German; Capt. P. Reid; Capt K. Lockwood; Capt H. Elliott; Capt. R. Barry; Capt. R. Howe; Capt. J. Lados; Capt. C. Lewthwaite; Flt. Lt. N. Forbes; Flt. Lt. H. Wardle; Lt. P. Storie Pugh; Lt. G. Wardle; Lt. Z. Mikusinski	British / Polish	Canteen tunnel	Detected
May 31	Lt. R. Collin	French	Hid in rafters of park pavilion	Successful Escape
May ???	???	Polish / French	???	Detected
June 9	Lt. P. Mairesse Lebrun	French	Hid in rafters of park pavilion, dressed as civilian	Recaptured; Grossbothen
June 18	Lt. P. Odry	French	Hid in rafters of park pavilion	Recaptured; Gross Sermuth
June 25	Lt. E. Boulé	French	Attempted to walk out disguised as a woman.	Detected
July 1	Lt. P. Mairesse Lebrun	French	Vaulted over barbed wire fence	Successful Escape
July 2	???	Polish	Hole in chapel	Detected
July 16	Lt. J. Stepniak	Polish	Escaped from hospital	Recaptured; Kraków, Poland
July 18	Lt. Tatistcheff	French	Through wire from Schützenhaus camp	Successful Escape
July 20	Capt. H. Elliott; Capt. J. Lados	British / Polish	Escaped through Terrace House	Detected
July 23	Capt. J. Lados	Polish	From solitary down west side of castle	Recaptured; Swiss border
July 28	Lt. A. Thibaud; Lt. R. Perrin	French	Through an air shaft into Kommandantur, then as workers through gate.	Recaptured; Leisnig
July 31	Flt. Lt. F. Flinn; Lt. P. Allan; Lt. T. Elliott; Lt. Cheetham; Lt. Middleton; Lt. Hyde-Thomson; Lt. Barton; Lt. Arcq; Lt. Verkest; Cadet Officer Karpf	British / Polish / Belgian	"Toilet Tunnel"	Detected
July ???	???	French	Tunnel in French quarters	Detected
November 17	Cadet ensign J. Hageman; Cadet ensign F. Geerligs	Dutch	Disguised as members of the league of German girls	Detected
August 4	Flt. Lt. D. Thom; Lt. J. Boustead	British	Walked out dressed as Hitler Youth	Detected
August 13	Capt. D. Dufour; Lt. J. Smit	Dutch	Hid inside well	Recaptured; Singen
August 14	Capt. W. Lawton	British	Park walk with orderlies	Recaptured; Zschirla
August 15	Lt. Gerrit Dames	Dutch	Through hole in park wire, intended as diversion for Hans Larive and Francis Steinmetz escape.	Detected
August 15	Lt. Hans Larive; Lt. Francis Steinmetz	Dutch	Hid inside well	Successful Escape
August 20	Lt. Kroner	Polish	Escaped from Königswartha Hospital	Successful Escape
August 21	Lt. P. Durant	French	Park walk with orderlies	Recaptured; Colditz
August 23	Capt. Machiel van den Heuvel; Capt. N. Hogerland	Dutch	Cut bars in canteen window	Detected
August 28	Lt. A. Neave	British	Walk towards gate disguised as German officer	Detected
August 29	Lt. R. Mascret	French	Escaped from Schneckwitz Hospital	Recaptured; Mainz
August ???	Capt. P. Reid	British	Escaped through window of solitary confinement	Detected
September 1	Lt. Col. G. German; Sqn. Leader B. Paddon; Maj. A. Anderson	British	Tunnel through kitchen basement	Detected
September 19	Maj. Cornelis Giebel; Lt. Oscar Drijber	Dutch	Hid inside well	Successful Escape
September 25	Lt. A. Boucheron	French	Escaped from Zeitz Hospital, recaptured then escaped en route to Düsseldorf prison	Successful Escape
September 28	Lt. Proutchenko; Lt. Jurowski; Lt. Wbcholzew	French	Through wire from Schützenhaus	Recaptured; Schaffhausen
October 6	Lt. P. Storie-Pugh; Unknown Dutch officer	British / Dutch	Over roofs	Detected
October 7	Lt. H. Desjobert	French	Attempted to climb park fence	Detected
October 7	???	British	Tunnel in British wash house	Detected
October 14	Lt. P. Odry; Lt. Navelet	French	Escaped from window at Elsterhorst Hospital	Successful Escape
October 15	Lt. J. Charvet; Lt. P. Levy	French	Escaped from window at Elsterhorst Hospital	Recaptured; Aachen
October 22	Lt. G. Diedler	French	Escaped from window at Elsterhorst Hospital	Recaptured outside hospital
October ???	???	French	Tunnel from quarters	Detected
November 8	Lt. M. Leroy; Lt. M. Lejeune; Lt. Verlaye	Belgian / French	Cut wire of park fence	Recaptured outside castle wall
November 22	Lt. G. Wardle; Lt. Wojchieckowski	British / Polish	Hidden inside well	Detected
November 23	Flt. Lt. D. Donaldson; Flt. Lt. D. Thom	British	Over roof of Kellerhaus	Detected
November 23	Capt. J. Rogers; Capt. C. Lewthwaite; Lt. G. Wardle; Lt. A. Neave	British	Disguised as Polish orderlies	Detected
November 25	???	British	Tunnel in British quarters	Detected
November 25	Lt. M. Girot	French	Through main gate dressed as orderly	Recaptured; Frankfurt
November 28	Giles Romilly	British	Dressed as orderly	Detected
December 12	Lt. Charles Douw van der Krap; Sub Lt. Frits Kruimink	Dutch	Park under pile of leaves	Detected
December 15	Capt. E. Steenhouwer; Lt. J. baron van Lynden	Dutch	Dressed as German officers	Detected
December 17	Lt. J. Durand-Hornus; Lt. J. Prot; Lt. G. de Frondeville	French	Escaped into fog on trip to dentist. Prot KIA: 29 January 1944, Mount Belvedere	Successful Escape

== 1942 escape attempts ==
Date	Name	Nationality	Method	Result
January 5	Lt. A. Neave; Lt. A. Luteijn	British / Dutch	Under theatre out of guardhouse as German officers	Successful Escape
January 6	Lt. H. Donkers; Lt. J. Hyde-Thomson	Dutch / British	Under theatre out of guardhouse as German officers	Recaptured; Ulm station
January 9	Lt. de Bykowitz	French	Jumped from train to Riesa	Detected
January 14	Flt. Lt. F. Flinn	British	British snow tunnel on canteen roof	Detected
January 16	Lt. R. Madin; Lt. J. Paille; Lt. B. Cazaumayou; Six other officers	French	The "French Tunnel"	Detected
January 20	Capt. Dr. Le Guet; Padre Jean-Jean	French	Ran away during private Sacrament of Confession	Recaptured; Frankfurt & Saarbrücken
January 20	Cadet Officer C. Linck	Dutch	Inside postal service sack	Detected
January 21	Capt. P. Reid; Lt. A. Orr-Ewing; Lt. W. O'Hara; Lt. Mackinsie; Lt. J. Boustead; Lt. E. Harrison	British	British snow tunnel on canteen roof	Detected
January 27	Flt. Lt. N. Forbes	British	Digging under stage	Detected
February 27	Capt. Gerrit Dames; Capt. J. Hageman	Dutch	Tunnel under terrace	Detected
March 2	Flt. Lt. F. Flinn; Cadet Officer C. Linck	British / Dutch	Escaped on way to Arrest House	Recaptured; Colditz
March 18	???	???	Tunnel in sick bay	Detected
March 20	Lt. H. Desjobert; Lt. A. Thibaud	French	Hid in cart of rubble	Recaptured; Colditz
April 4	Flt. Lt. F. Flinn	British	Tunnel in British quarters	Detected
April 24	Lt. P. Manheimer	French	???	Recaptured; Colditz
April 26	Lt. W. Wychodzew; Lt. J. Niestrzeba	Polish	Escaped from military hospital in Gnaschwitz	Recaptured; Singen & Stuttgart
April 26	Sqn. Leader B. Paddon; Lt. J. Just	British / Polish	???	Recaptured; Leipzig
April 26	Captain L. Rémy	Belgian	Escaped from train station, took boat to Algeciras	Successful Escape
April ???	Lt. J. baron van Lynden	Dutch	Broke into German quarters to steal uniform	Detected
April ???	???	Dutch	Hid in pile of leaves in park	Detected
May 10	Lt. D. Gill ???	British / Polish	Through the kitchen	Detected
May 28	Lt. M. Girot	French	Replaced French orderly on working party. Girot KIA: Gestapo, May 1944	Recaptured; Frankfurt
May 28	Lt. I. Price	British	???	Detected
June 2	Lt. M. Sinclair	British	Escaped from Leipzig hospital	Recaptured; Cologne
June 8	Lt. M. Sinclair	British	Escaped from holding cell	Recaptured; Cologne
June 9	Capt. W. Lawton; Capt. R. Howe; Lt. W. O'Hara; Lt. E. Harrison; Lt. I. Dickinson; Lt. V. Parker	British	In attic above British quarters	Detected
June 11	Sqn. Leader B. Paddon	British	Sent for court martial at Thorn, escaped from work party there. Smuggled out through Gdańsk	Successful Escape
June 45	Lt. R. Bouillez	French	Sent for court martial in Stuttgart, jumped train but found unconscious next to tracks, sent to hospital, escaped from hospital.	Successful Escape
July 6	???	Dutch	Dutch tunnel	Detected
July 7	Lt. J. Tucki	Polish	In Polish orderly working party	Detected
July 15	Flt. Lt. V. Parker; Lt. M. Keillar	British	???, Keillar transferred to Lamsdorf	Detected
July 19	???	Polish / Belgian	Tunnel in Saalhaus	Detected
July 26	Capt. M. van den Heuvel; Lt. H. Vinkinbosch; Lt. Verleye; Lt. F. Kruimink; Lt. P. Storie-Pugh	Belgian / British / Dutch	Scullery tunnel	Detected
July 26	???	British	Tunnel in senior officers' quarters	Detected
August 18	Flt. Lt. J. Dickinson	British	Jumped wall of exercise yard of Colditz town jail, stole bicycle	Recaptured; Chemnitz
August 19	Capt. P. Reid; Capt. R. Barry	British	Delousing shed tunnel	Detected
August 20	Lt. Delarne	French	Park walk disguised as painter	Detected
August 25	Flt. Lt. N. Forbes; Lt. K. Lee	British	Escaped en route to Leipzig for court martial.	Recaptured; Leipzig
August 28	Flt. Lt. J. Dickinson	British	Hid underneath bread delivery van.	Detected
August 29	Capt. R. Barry; Capt. P. Reid	British	Solitary confinement: Barry cut through bars, Reid dug tunnel	Detected
September 1	Lt. W. Zelaźniewicz	Polish	Escaped on park walk	Recaptured; Podelwitz
September 2	Lt. Cdr. W. Stephens	British	Escaped from Colditz train station (returning from Lamsdorf)	Recaptured; Outside Colditz
September 7	Flt. Lt. D. Bruce	British	Hid inside Red Cross tea chest, climbed down outer wall via bedsheet rope.	Recaptured; Gdańsk
September 8	Flt. Lt. J. Dickinson	British	Attempted escape while on exercise in the park	Detected
September 9	Capt. W. Lawton; Capt. T. Beets; Lt. Donkers; Lt. G. Wardle	British / Dutch	Broke into Kommandant's office, cut hole into storeroom, out of storeroom in German and Polish orderly uniforms.	Recaptured; Commichau & Dobeln
September 9	Flt. Lt. H.N. Fowler; Lt. D. van Doorninck	British / Dutch	Broke into Kommandant's office, cut hole into storeroom, out of storeroom in German and Polish orderly uniforms. Fowler died March 1944	Successful Escape
September 10	???	British	Subaltern's tunnel	Detected
October 14	Maj. R.B. Littledale; Lt. Cdr. W. Stephens; Capt. P. Reid; Flt. Lt. H. Wardle	British	Escape through kitchen into German yard, across yard into Kommandantur cellar, out cellar into dry moat. Littledale KIA: August 1944	Successful Escape
October 23	???	Dutch	Attempt at hole under theatre	Detected
October ???	Lt. P. Storie-Pugh; Lt. F. Kruimink	British / Dutch	Over roof of Kellerhaus. Discovered by dog on ground.	Detected
November 26	Lt. M. Sinclair; Lt. C. Klein	British / French	Through well in Kommandantur	Recaptured; Tuttlingen & Plauen
November 27	Capt. R. Barry; Lt. Aulard	British / French	Through well in Kommandantur	Detected
November ???	Lt. M. Bissell	British	Tunnel under altar steps in chapel	Detected
December 6	Lt. Z. Kepa; Lt. T. Osiecki; Lt. A. Slipko	Polish	Over orderlies' roof	Detected
December 14	Lt. M. Sinclair	British	From Weinsberg after recapture	Recaptured; Weinsberg
December 15	Lt. van der Falk Bouman	Dutch	Disguised as German soldier	Recaptured; Emmendingen
December 19	CPO W. Hammond. CPO D. Lister	British	Transferred to Lamsdorf since not officers, escaped from Breslau work party	Successful Escape
December 28	Lt. A. Perodeau	French	Impersonated Willi Pöhnert	Detected

== 1943 escape attempts ==
Date	Name	Nationality	Method	Result
January ???	Lt. Gris Davies-Scourfield; Others	British	Pulpit tunnel under chapel	Detected
March 7	Capt. B. Mazumdar	British (India)	Hunger strike in order to receive transfer, escapes twice from new camp, reaches Switzerland	Successful Escape
March 7	Flt. Lt. J. Dickinson	British	Jumps over wall of exercise area of Colditz town jail.	Recaptured; Chemnitz
April 5	Capt. D. Dufour; Flt. Lt. A. van Rood	British / Dutch	Dressed as German officers	Detected
April 8	Capt. Pemberton-How	British	Schützenhaus. In manhole after search.	Detected
April 8	Lt. E. Desbats; Lt. J. Caillaud	French	Over roof of castle	Detected
April 28	Capt. Ion Ferguson RAMC	British	Transfer order granted, Works as doctor at Stalag IV-D certifying prisoners insane. Convinces Germans he is himself insane, repatriated in January 1945.	Successful Escape
April ???	???	British	Hole under dentist office chair.	Detected
May 1	Flt. Lt. V. Parker; Flt. Lt. N. Forbes; Lt. D. Wheeler	British	"Revier" tunnel	Detected
May 11	Flt. Lt. D. Thom	British	Vaults fence of park	Recaptured outside wall
May ???	Lt. M. Sinclair; Lt. G. Davies-Scourfield	British	Cut hole in park fence wire	Detected
May ???	Flt. Lt. J. Best; Lt. M. Harvey; Others	British	Attempted to re-open "French Tunnel"	Detected
June 7	Lt. J.J.L. baron van Lynden	Dutch	During Dutch transfer to Stanislau	Successful Escape
June 11	Lt. A. Perrin	French	Through "witches' walk"	Detected
July 8	Lt. M. Fahy	French	Escapes from hospital in Hohenstein-Ernstthal	Recaptured; Kaufungen
July 12	Lt. A. Darthenay	French	Escapes from hospital in Hohenstein-Ernstthal. Joined French Resistance. KIA: Gestapo 7 April 1944	Successful Escape
July 13	Lt. C. Klein; Giles Romilly	Free French / British	Hidden in baggage pile at Colditz rail station	Detected
July 13	Lt. T. Barrott; Lt. D. Hamilton; Lt. C. Sandbach	British	Exchanged identities with French officers in transit to Lübeck	Detected
July ???	Lt. J. Best; Lt. M. Harvey; Others	British	"French Tunnel" re-opening attempt	Detected
August 10	Lt. P. Allan; Lt. A. Campbell; Others	British	"Whitechapel Deep" tunnel	Detected
September 3	Capt. L. Pope; Lt. M. Sinclair; Lt. J. Hyde-Thomson	British	Attempted to impersonate a German sergeant	Detected
September 11	Lt. W. Miller; Lt. R. Boustead	British	Exchanged places with Lt. Stepninc and Lt. Jablonowski during Polish transfer	Detected
September 16	Lt. A. Orr-Ewing	British	As French orderly on exercise	Detected
September 30	Lt. G. Davies-Scourfield	British	Out of yard in trash pile	Recaptured; Hildescheim
September ???	???	British	"Mayfair Maggies" tunnel	Detected
October 7	Lt. A. Orr-Ewing	British	Out of yard in trash pile	Detected
November 3	???	British	Orderlies who escaped from work party at Colditz train station	Recaptured; Cottbus
November 25	Lt. J. Rawson	British	???	Detected

== 1944 escape attempts ==
Date	Name	Nationality	Method	Result
January 19	Lt. M. Sinclair; Lt. J. Best	British	Sixty second rope escape down west terrace	Recaptured; Rheine
January 28	Lt. W. Millar	Canadian	Broke into German courtyard, hung from bottom of German truck. Believed killed by SS at Mauthausen in July 1944.	Unknown
January 31	Capt. C. Lewthwaite	British	Hid under trash pile	Detected
February 3	Lt. A. Orr-Ewing	British	Jumps fence, swims across Mulde river	Recaptured; Colditz
March 17	???	British	"Crown Deep" tunnel	Detected
March 26	Flt. Lt. V. Parker; Lt. M. Harvey	British	From air-raid shelter	Detected
April 19	Flt. Lt. D. Bruce	British	Cut bars on north side of castle, reached wire fence	Detected
April 29	Lt. D. Moir; Lt. M. Edwards; Lt. D. Wheeler; Lt. P. Fergusson	British	Intentionally sloppy escape attempt in hopes to be placed in town jail.	Detected
April ???	???	British	Hexengang corridor	Detected
April ???	Lt. J. Hamilton-Baillie	British	Into sewers through shower drain	Detected
May 2	Lt. J. Beaumont	British	Hidden under blanked sown with leaves	Recaptured; 3 km from Colditz
May 3	Lt. G. Wardle	British	Escape through orderlies quarters	Detected
May 5	Capt. H. Elliott; Flt. Lt. F. Flinn; Lt. J. Barnett; Lt. M. Wynn	British	Faked illnesses, repatriated	Successful Escape
May 29	Capt. F. Weldon; Lt. J. Hamilton-Baillie	British	Out of POW yard into Kommandantur attics, into storeroom on south side of German yard	Detected
June 1	Maj. A. Anderson; Others	British	Dentist chair tunnel	Detected
June 13	Lt. L. Pumphrey; Lt. M. Riviere	British	Tunnel through British kitchens	Detected
June 16	Maj. R. Lorraine; Flt. Lt. D. Bruce "Bosun" J. Chrisp	British	Tunnel through sewers into German yard	Detected
July 14	Flt. Lt. D. Thom	British	Escaped from hospital at Schmorkau	Recaptured
September 4	Lt. M. Sinclair	British	Jumped fence in park, wearing civilian clothes	Detected
September 18	Capt. C. Lewthwaite	British	Park walk under pile of leaves	Detected
September 25	Lt. M. Sinclair	British	Jumps over fence wire in park	Shot dead
From 1/1 til 4/15/45	Flt. Lt. W. Goldfinch; Flt. Lt. J. Best; Lt. A. Rolt; Lt. G. Wardle; Others	British	The "Colditz Cock" Glider	Unused (prison liberated by Allied forces prior to completion of glider)

== 1945 escape attempts ==
Date	Name	Nationality	Method	Result
	Lt.Col. M.B. Reid	British	The oldest British prisoner. Feigned heart disease by smoking heavily and drinking concentrated black coffee prior to medical examination and was repatriated.	Successful Escape
