= Attempts to escape Oflag IV-C =

Coordinates: 51.13078°N 12.80748°E

Prisoners made numerous attempts to escape from Oflag IV-C, one of the most famous German Army prisoner-of-war camps for officers in World War II. Between 30 and 36 men succeeded in their attempts; German and Allied sources differ on the numbers. The camp was situated in Colditz Castle, perched on a cliff overlooking the town of Colditz in Saxony.

The German Army made Colditz a Sonderlager (high-security prison camp), the only one of its type within Germany. Field Marshal Hermann Göring declared Colditz "escape-proof". There were many well-documented escapes and failed attempts by British, Canadian, French, Polish, Dutch, and Belgian inmates. Colditz Castle was not used as a prisoner of war camp in World War I.

The escapes from Colditz have been described in many works of fiction and documentaries. This has popularized the unrealistic image of prisoner of war escapes as being common; this is sometimes referred to as the "Colditz Myth".

== Methods and equipment ==
Prisoners contrived a number of methods to escape. They duplicated keys to doors, made copies of maps, forged Ausweise (identity papers), and manufactured their own tools. MI9, a department of the British War Office which specialized in escape equipment, communicated with the prisoners in code and smuggled escape equipment to them by hiding it in care packages from family or from non-existent charities. However, they never tampered with Red Cross care packages for fear it would force the Germans to stop their delivery to all camps. The Germans became skilled at intercepting packages containing contraband material.

The prisoners also used items from their Red Cross packages to bribe guards and local citizens. Since the Germans allowed the disabled Douglas Bader to leave the prison and visit the town of Colditz, he took chocolate and other luxuries with him for trading. Flight Lieutenant Cenek Chaloupka traded goods for information and even had a girlfriend in the town. David Stirling later took control of the black-market operations.

== The Singen route ==
Upon escaping from captivity, POWs still faced the considerable challenge of negotiating their way to non-hostile territory. The Singen route into Switzerland was discovered by Dutch naval lieutenant Hans Larive in 1940 on his first escape attempt from Oflag VI-A in Soest. Larive was caught near Singen close to the Swiss border. The interrogating Gestapo officer was so confident that the war would soon be won by Germany that he told Larive of a safe way across the border. Near the road between Singen and Gotmadingen there is the hamlet of Hofenacker which belongs to the Swiss municipality of Ramsen in the canton of Schaffhausen. One of the farm buildings of Hofenacker, Spiesshof, stands directly on the road at the tip of what is known as the Ramsen Salient. By taking the Singen-Gotmadingen road, turning left after Spiesshof and remaining on the track, the escapee could enter Switzerland. Larive memorized the route and many prisoners later escaped using it. Among them were Larive himself, Francis Steinmetz, Anthony Luteyn, Airey Neave, Pat Reid and Howard Wardle.

== Unsuccessful attempts ==
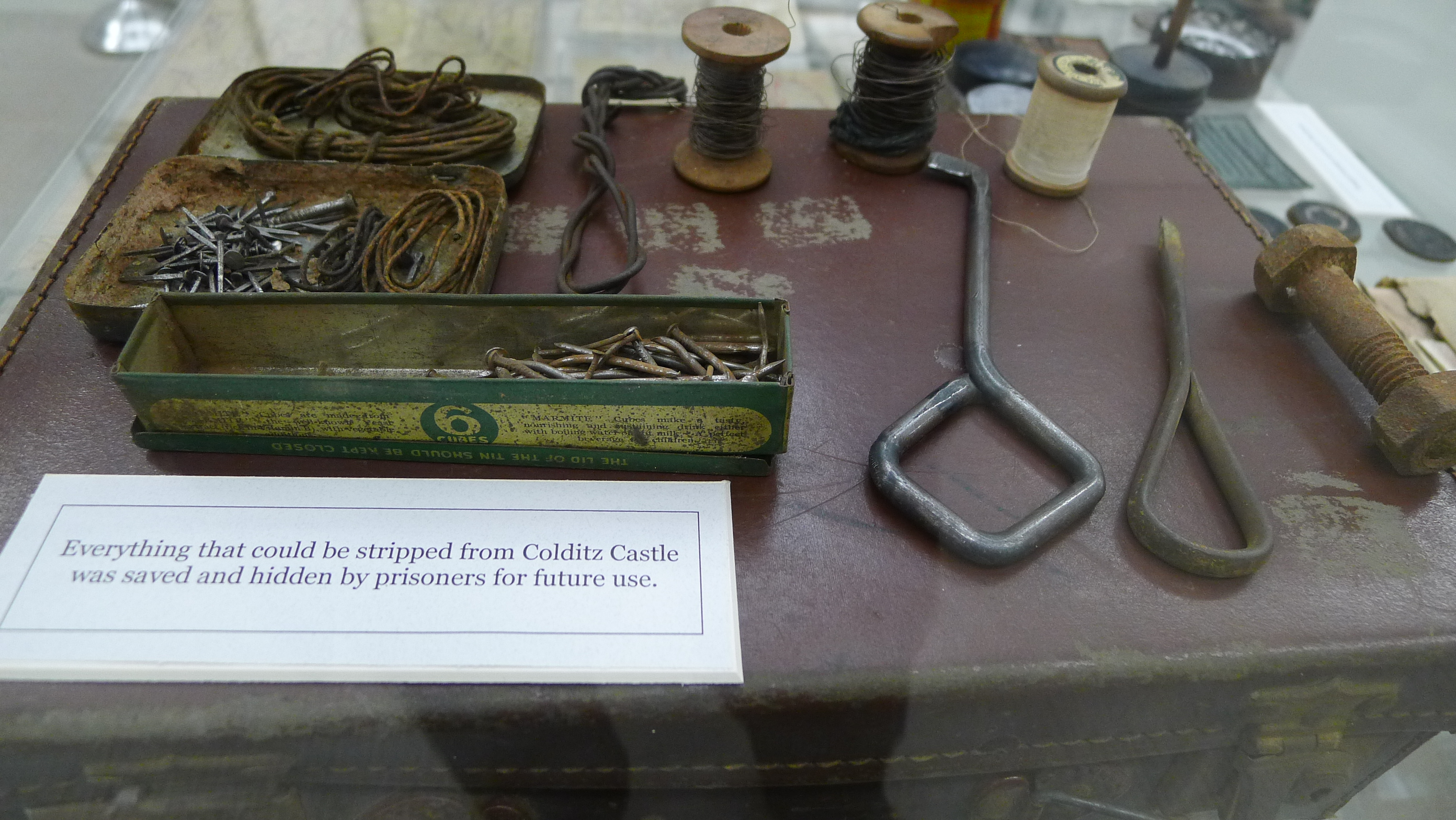
Metal objects hidden by Colditz Castle prisoners for future use, on display in the former International Museum of World War II. Photo: Lee Wright, 2015

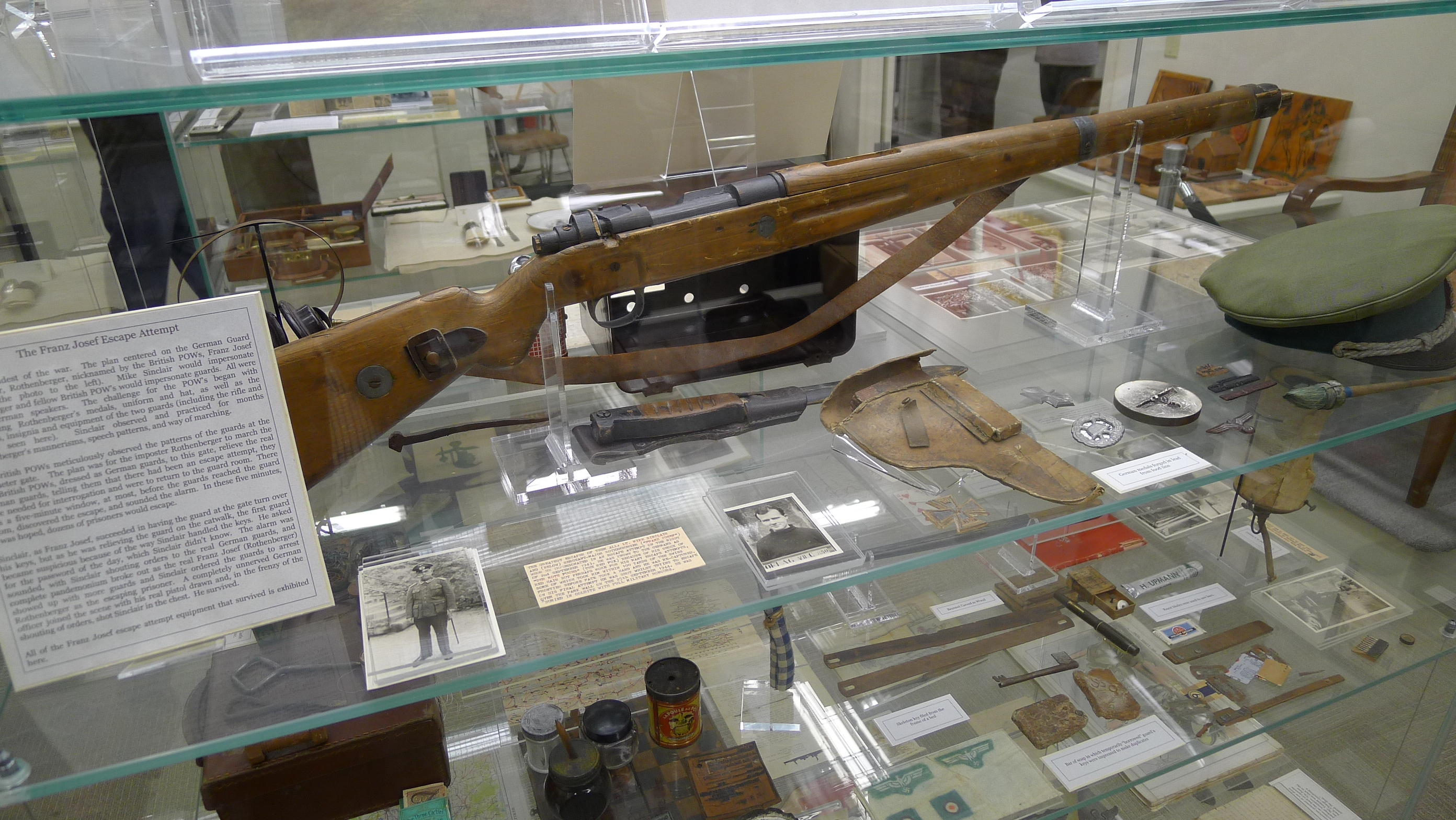
Fake equipment used in the 'Franz Josef Escape Attempt'. Exhibits in The International Museum of WW2. Photo: Lee Wright, 2015

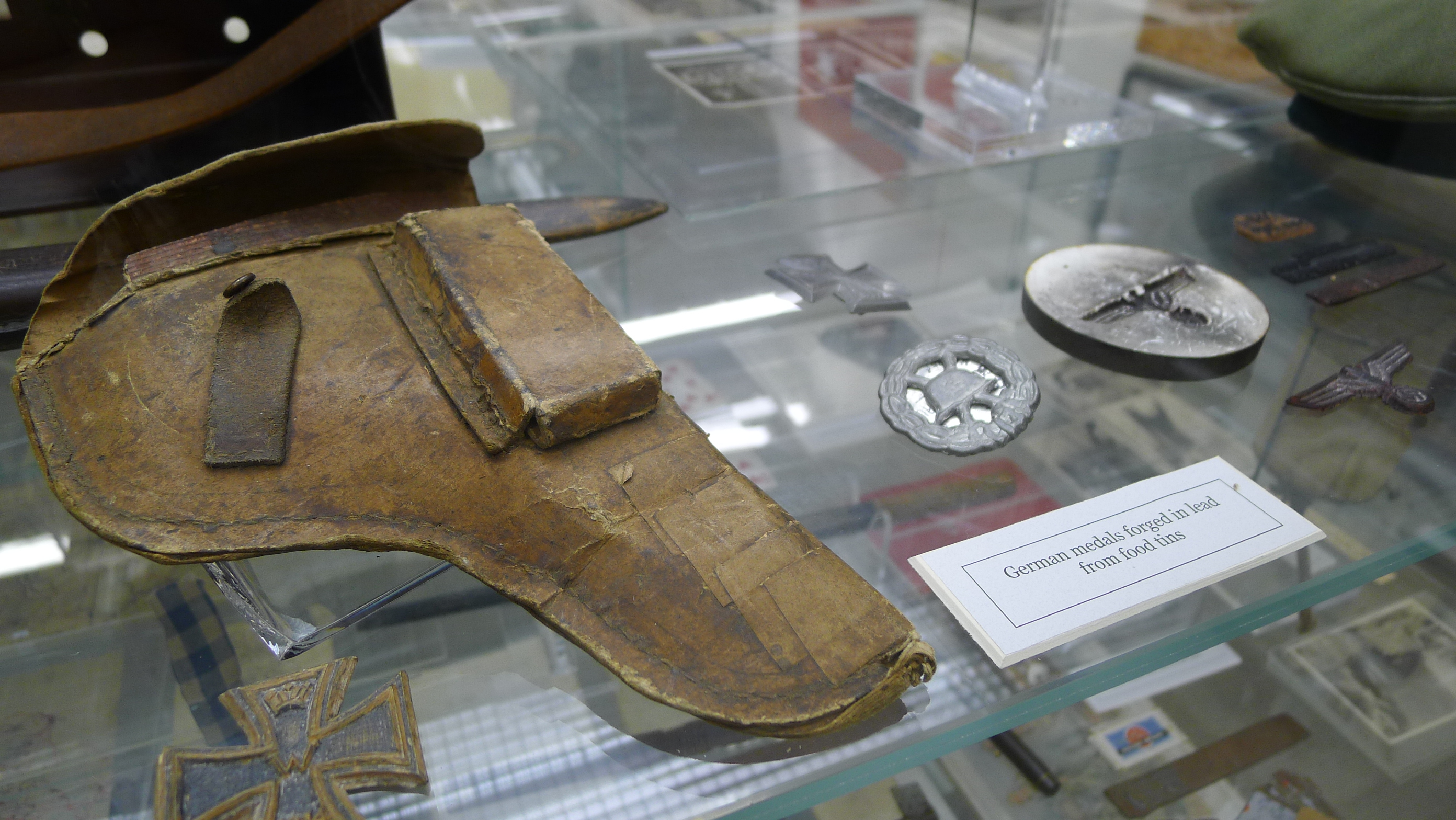
Fake holster and medals used in the 'Franz Josef Escape Attempt'. Exhibits in The International Museum of WW2 Photo: Lee Wright, 2015

Most escape attempts failed. Pat Reid, who later wrote about his experiences in Colditz, failed to escape at first and then became an "escape officer", charged with coordinating the various national groups so they would not ruin each other's escape attempts. Escape officers were generally not themselves permitted to escape. Many tried unsuccessfully to escape in disguise: Airey Neave twice dressed as a guard, French Lieutenant Boulé disguised in drag, British Lieutenant Michael Sinclair even dressed as German Sergeant Major Rothenberger (an NCO in the camp garrison), when he tried to organize a mass escape, and French Lieutenant Perodeau disguised himself as camp electrician Willi Pönert ("Little Willi"):

On the night of 28 December 1942, one of the French officers deliberately blew out the fuse on the lights in the courtyard. As they had anticipated, Pöhnert was summoned, and while he was fixing the lights, Lieutenant Perodeau, dressed almost identically to Pöhnert and carrying a tool box, walked casually out of the courtyard gate. He passed the first guard without incident, but the guard at the main gate asked for his token — tokens were issued to each guard and staff member at the camp guardhouse specifically to avoid this type of escape — with no hope of bluffing his way out of this, Perodeau surrendered.

Dutch sculptors made two clay heads to stand in for escaping officers at roll call. Later, "ghosts", officers who had faked a successful escape and hidden in the castle, took the place of escaping prisoners at roll call in order to delay discovery for as long as possible.

Camp guards collected so much escape equipment that they established a museum. Local photographer Johannes Lange took photographs of the would-be escapers in their disguises or re-enacting their attempts for the camera, such as Pönert and his French imitator side by side. Along with the Lange photographs, one of the two sculpted clay heads was displayed proudly in the museum. Security officer Reinhold Eggers made them a regular part of Das Abwehrblatt, a weekly magazine for German POW camps.

=== The death of Michael Sinclair ===
There was only one confirmed death during the escape attempts: British Lieutenant Michael Sinclair in September 1944. Sinclair attempted a repeat of the 1941 French over the wire escape. Security officer Eggers warned him after which Sinclair was fired upon by guards. A bullet hit Sinclair on the elbow and ricocheted through his heart.

Sinclair's death was one of two events explicitly excluded from the document attesting to the prisoners' good care that they signed in April 1945. The Germans buried Sinclair in Colditz cemetery with full military honours — his casket was draped with a Union Jack flag made by the German guards, and he received a seven-gun salute. After the war, he was awarded the Distinguished Service Order, the only man to receive it for escaping during World War II. He is buried in grave number 10.1.14 at Berlin War Cemetery in the Charlottenburg-Wilmersdorf district of Berlin.

=== The Red Cross tea chest ===
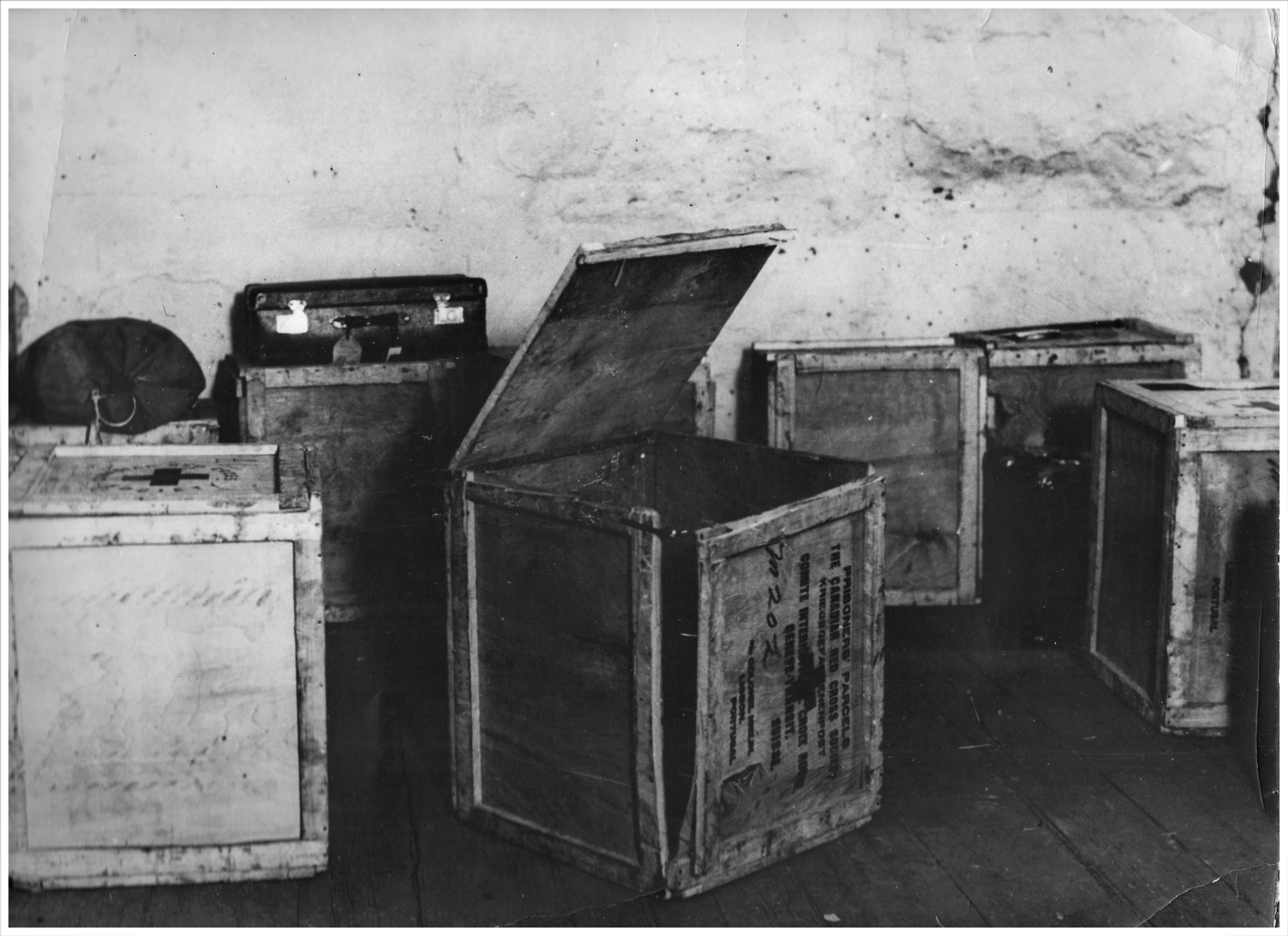
The chest used by Dominic Bruce in the 'tea chest' escape.

Because of his very small stature, Flight Lieutenant Dominic Bruce was known ironically as the "medium-sized man". He arrived at Colditz in 1942 (after attempting to escape from Spangenberg Castle disguised as a Red Cross doctor). When a new commandant arrived at Colditz in the summer of the same year, he enforced rules restricting prisoners' personal belongings. On 8 September, POWs were told to pack up all excess belongings and an assortment of boxes was delivered to carry them into storage. Dominic Bruce seized the opportunity and was packed inside of a Red Cross packing case, three feet square, with just a file and a 40-foot (12 m) rope made of bed sheets. Bruce was then taken to a storeroom on the third floor of the German Kommandantur, and that night made his escape. The following morning the German guards stationed found the dangling bed rope. When they entered the storeroom, they found the empty box on which Bruce had inscribed Die Luft in Colditz gefällt mir nicht mehr. Auf Wiedersehen! — "The air in Colditz no longer pleases me. See you later!" Bruce was recaptured a week later trying to stow aboard a Swedish ship in Danzig.

=== The mattress ===
In late 1940, British officer "Peter" Allan (real name, Anthony Murray Allan) found out that the Germans were moving several mattresses from the castle to another camp and decided that it would be his way out. He let the French officers moving the mattresses know that one would be a little bit heavier. Allan, a fluent German speaker thanks to his schooling in Germany before the war, prior to attending Tonbridge School, dressed himself up in a Hitlerjugend (Hitler Youth) uniform, stuffed Reichsmarks in his pockets, and had himself sewn into one of the mattresses. He managed to get himself loaded onto the truck, and unloaded into an empty house within the town. Cutting himself out of the mattress several hours later, when all he could hear was silence, he climbed out of the window into the garden and walked down the road towards his freedom.

Along the 161 km (100 mi) route to Vienna via Stuttgart he got a lift with a senior SS officer. Allan recalled that ride as the scariest moment of his life, "I think, almost vulgarly, I needed a new pair of trousers." Allan had been aiming to reach Poland, but soon after reaching Vienna he found he was out of money. At this time the Americans had not yet entered the war, so Allan decided to ask the American consulate for assistance. He was refused. Allan's stepmother, Lois Allan (founder of Fuzzy Felt toys in the UK), was a US citizen and he felt that they would provide sanctuary because of this. Allan had been on the run at this point for nine days. Broke, exhausted, and hungry, he fell asleep in a park. Upon waking he discovered he could no longer walk owing to his starvation. Soon afterwards he was picked up and returned to Colditz, where he spent the next three months in solitary confinement.

=== The bed sheet rope ===
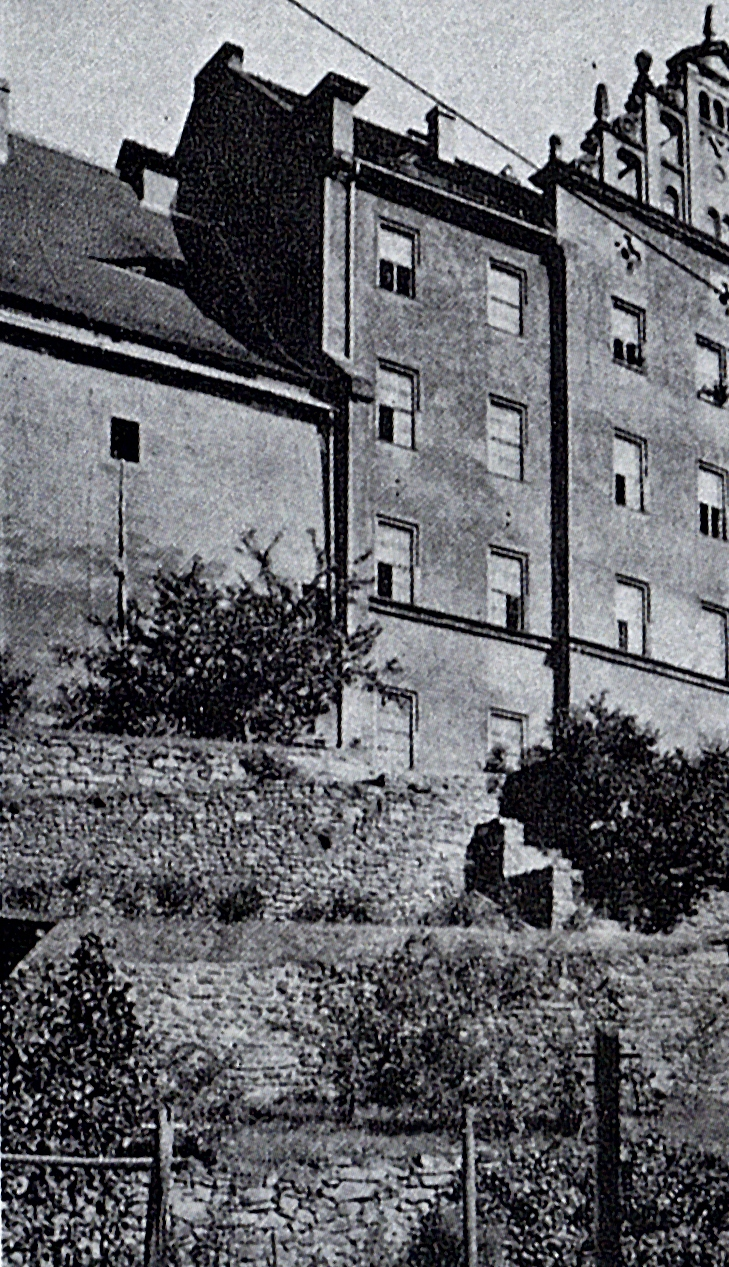
Photo of the bed sheet rope used in the 'tea chest' escape from Colditz by Dominic Bruce.

On 12 May 1941, Polish Lieutenants Miki Surmanowicz and Mietek Chmiel, attempted to rappel down a 36 m (120 Ft) wall to freedom on a rope constructed out of bed sheets. In order to get into position, both men put themselves into solitary confinement. After forcing open the door and picking the locks, they made their way to the courtyard, where they climbed up to a narrow ledge. From the ledge they were able to cross to the guard house roof, and climb through an open window on the outer wall. Reusing their bed sheet rope, they lowered themselves towards the ground. They were caught when the German guards heard the hobnailed boots of one of the escapers scraping the outside of the guardhouse wall. The guard who spotted the escapers shouted 'Hände hoch!' (Hands up!) to the men as they were descending the rope.

=== The German lady ===
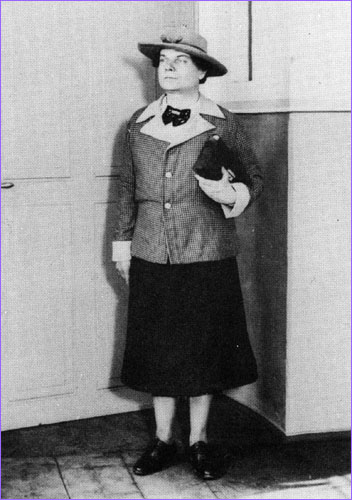
Lieutenant Bouley after his failed escape attempt from Colditz

On 5 June 1941, while returning from the park to the castle, some British prisoners noticed that a passing lady had dropped her watch. One of the British called out to her, but the lady kept walking instead of retrieving her watch. This aroused the suspicion of the German guards and, upon inspection, "she" was revealed to be a French officer, Lieutenant Chasseurs Alpins Bouley, dressed as a very respectable woman.

=== The canteen tunnel ===
Early in 1941, the British prisoners had gained access to the sewers and drains which ran beneath the floors of the castle. Entrance to these was from a manhole cover in the floor of the canteen. After initial reconnaissance trips, it was decided that the drain should be extended, and an exit made in a small grassy area which was overlooked from the canteen window. From here, they planned to climb down the hill, and drop down below the steep outside east wall of the castle. Knowing which sentry would be on duty on the night of the escape, they pooled their resources and collected 500 Reichsmark for a bribe (100 of which were paid up front). This plan took three months of preparation. On the evening of 29 May 1941, Pat Reid hid in the canteen when it was locked up for the night. He removed the bolt from the lock on the door and returned to the courtyard. After the evening meeting, the chosen escapees slipped into the canteen unnoticed. They entered the tunnel and waited for the signal to proceed. Unknown to the prisoners, they had been reported by the bribed guard. Waiting on the grassy area was Hauptmann Priem and his guard force.

Pat Reid recalls:

"I climbed out on to the grass and Rupert Barry, immediately behind me, started to follow. My shadow was cast on the wall of the Kommandantur, and at that moment I noticed a second shadow beside my own. It held a gun. I yelled to Rupert to get back as a voice behind me shouted, Hände hoch! Hände hoch!. I turned to face a German officer leveling his pistol at me."

Behind him in the tunnel were seven British and four Polish officers. On his order the remaining men backed up the tunnel to evade detection, but the Germans were waiting for them outside the canteen. Not wanting to give their captors any satisfaction, the British burst into laughter as they came out.

Hauptmann Priem ends the story:

"And the guard? He kept his 100 Marks; he got extra leave, promotion and the War Service Cross."

=== The French tunnel ===
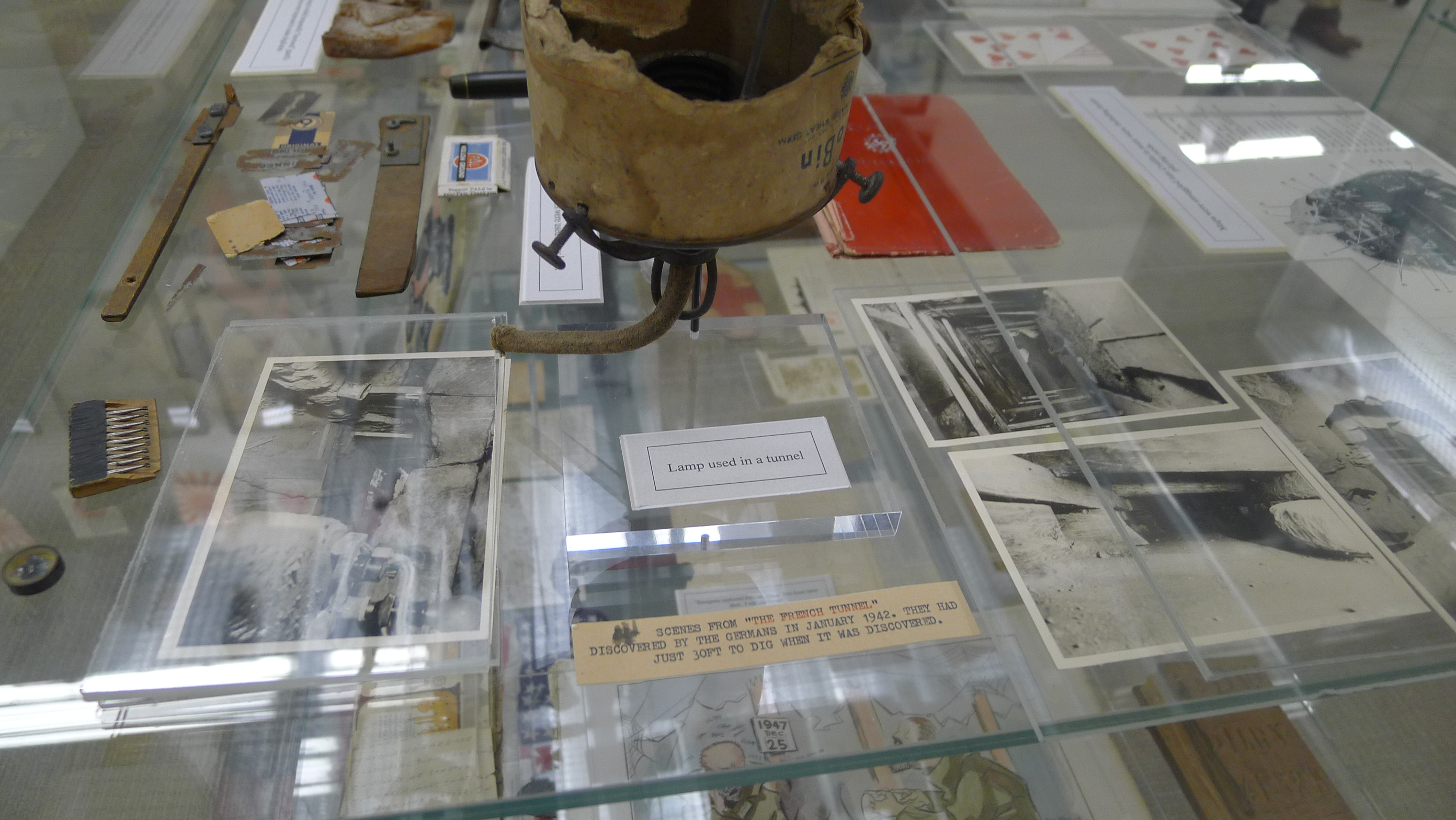
Equipment etc. from 'the French tunnel'. Exhibits in The International Museum of WW2. Photo: Lee Wright, 2015

Nine French officers organized a long-term tunnel-digging project, the longest ever attempted out of Colditz Castle. Deciding that the exit should be on the steep drop leading down towards the recreation area, outside the eastern walls of the castle, they began to scout for a possible location for the entrance. The problem was solved by Lieutenants Cazaumayo and Paille, who had gained access to the clock tower in 1940.

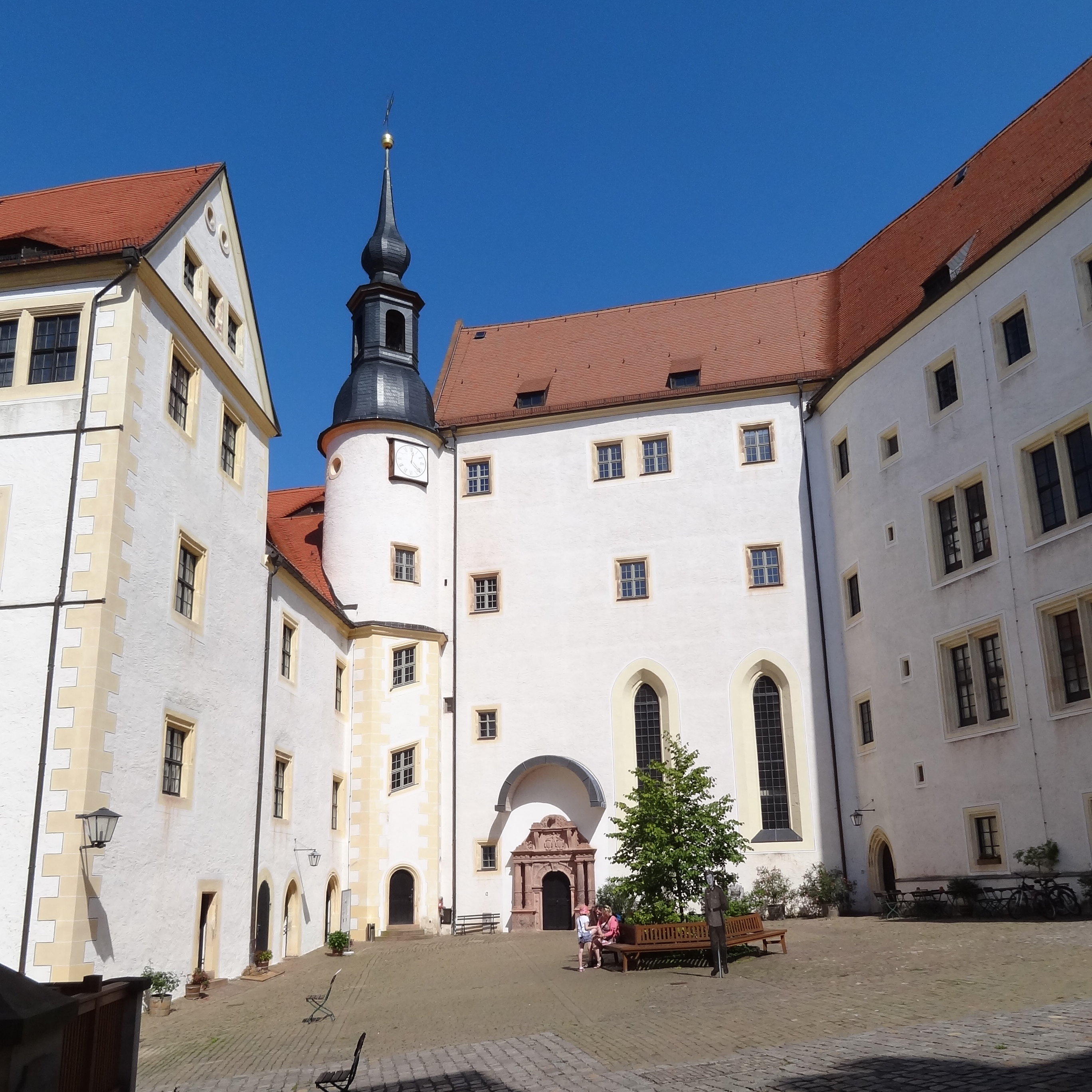
The inner courtyard of Colditz castle which was used as the prison yard when the castle was the POW camp Oflag IV-C during World War II. French prisoners used the bell tower (left) to access the wine cellar from which they tunneled under the chapel (behind the tree).

Their tunnel began at the top of a chapel's clock tower and descended 8.6 meters (28.2 Ft) into the ground using the shaft which contained the ropes and weights for the clock. They found that the weights which used to hang down the shaft, and the chains, had been removed. This left an empty shaft which extended from the clock to the cellars below. After the previous escape attempts by Cazaumayo and Paille, the doors (one on each floor) which had provided access to the tower, had been bricked up in order to prevent further escape attempts. However, by sealing up the tower the Germans had in essence provided a secure location where tunnelling could be done without being noticed. The French this time gained access to the tower from the attics, descended 35 m to the cellars, and began work on a horizontal shaft in June 1941. This shaft work would continue for a further eight months.

The horizontal shaft towards the chapel progressed 4 m (13 Ft) before they hit rock too hard to dig. They then decided to dig upwards towards the chapel floor. From here the tunnel continued underneath the wooden floor of the chapel for a distance of 13.5 m (44.3 Ft). To do this, seven heavy oak timbers in the floor, measuring 0.5 m (1.3 Ft) square, had to be cut through. Homemade saws, assembled from German table knives, were employed for this task. With this completed, the tunnel dropped vertically from the far corner of the chapel a further 5.2 m (17 Ft). The tunnel then proceeded out towards the proposed exit with two further descents, separated by shafts in the tough stone foundations of the castle. The tunnel now ran a horizontal distance of 44 m (144 Ft), reaching a final depth of 8.6 m (28.2 Ft) below the ground.

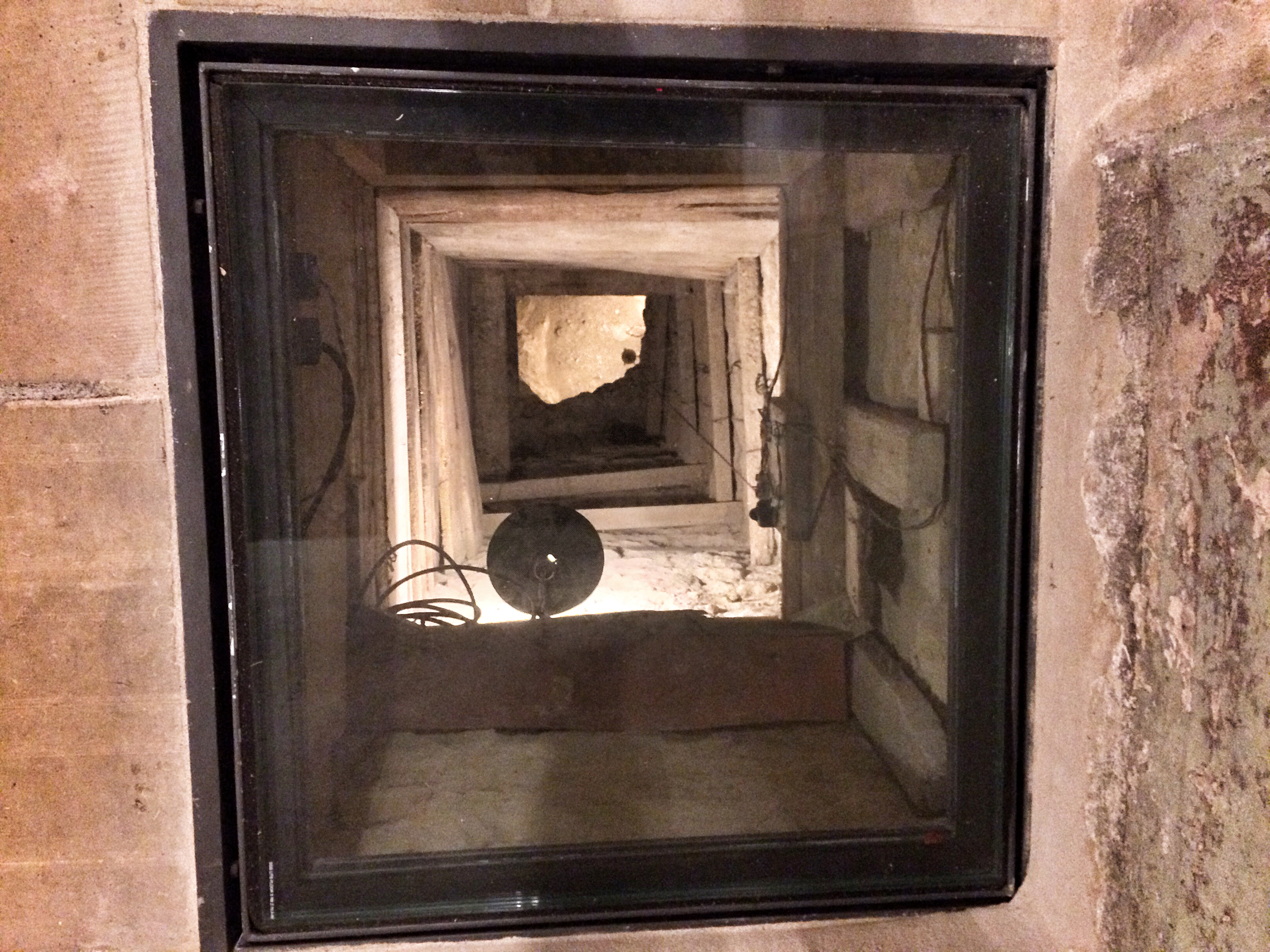
French prisoners, incarcerated in Colditz Castle during the Second World War, spent some 8 months digging an escape tunnel. This 5.2m vertical shaft, located in a corner of the chapel, is a small part of the construction.

Tunnelling continued well into 1942. By then Germans knew that the French were digging somewhere, based on the noise of tunnelling reverberating through the castle at night. The French thought that its entrance was undetectable. However, on 15 January the Germans eventually searched the sealed-off clock tower. Noises were heard below, and after lowering a small boy down the shaft, three French officers were found. After searching the cellar thoroughly, the entrance to the tunnel was eventually discovered a mere 2 m (6.5 ft) short of completion. The French were convinced that they had been betrayed by one of their own countrymen, but this was denied by the guards who demanded the French pay to repair the damage (estimated at 12,000 Reichsmark).

The tunnel had electric lighting along its whole length, powered by electricity from the chapel. This allowed the tunnellers to see what they were doing and signal the arrival of sentries. The entrance to the tunnel in the wine cellar was concealed by five large stones covering a small door, which left little trace of any hole. Debris was transported in sacks hoisted up the clock tower to the castle's attics. The wine cellar was regularly cleaned and re-dusted using dust harvested from the attic, so as to hide the reddish clay dust which was not present in the cellar ordinarily.

=== The "Colditz Cock" glider ===
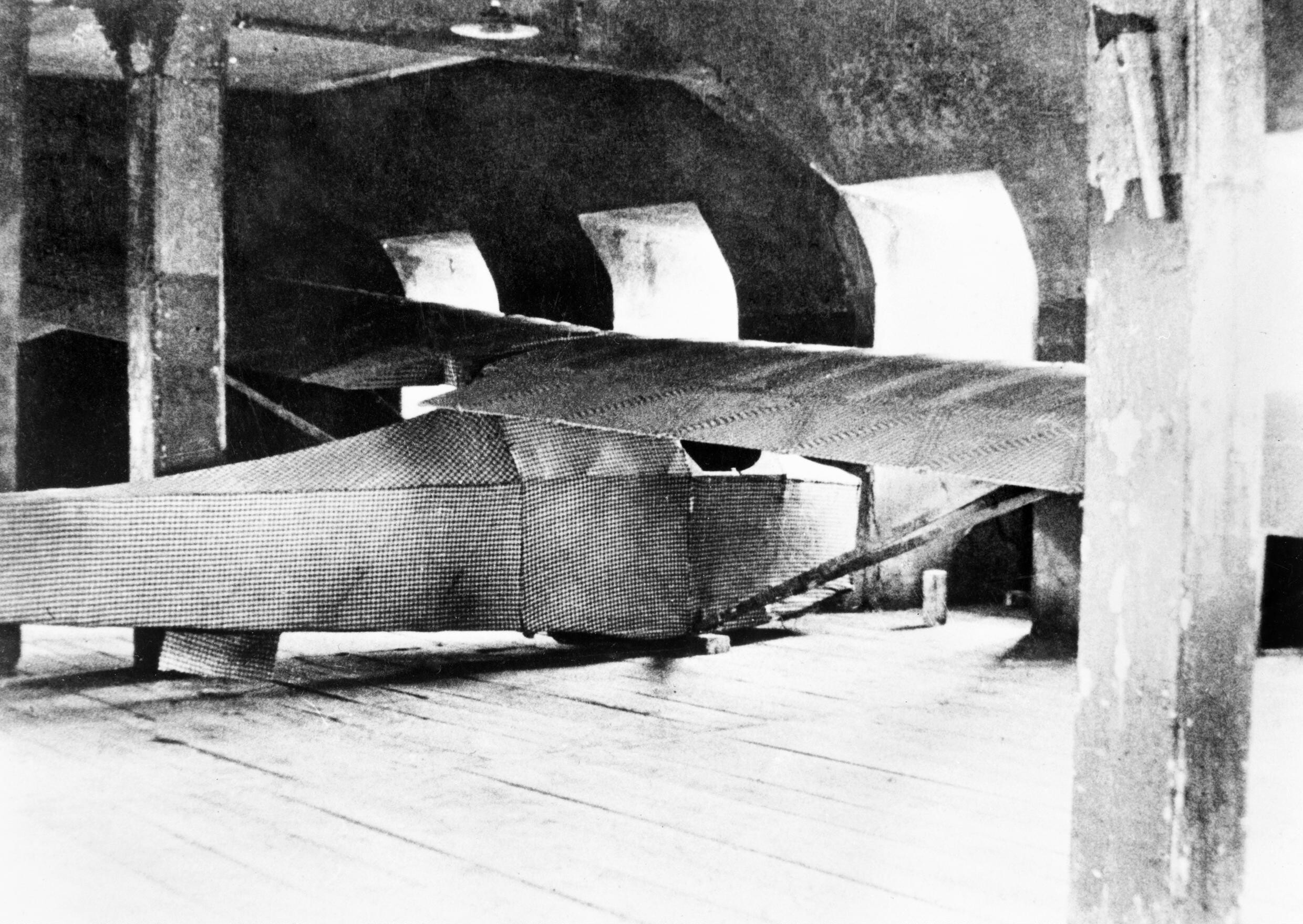
The only known photograph of the original "Cock" glider. Taken on 15 April 1945 by Lee Carson, one of two American newspaper correspondents assigned to the task force which captured the castle.

In one of the most ambitious escape attempts, the idea of building a glider was brought up by two British pilots, Jack Best and Bill Goldfinch, who had been sent to Colditz after escaping from another POW camp. They were encouraged by two army officers, Tony Rolt and David Walker, who had recently arrived in the camp. Tony Rolt recommended the chapel roof for launching, since he had observed that it was obscured from the view of the Germans.

Although the Colditz glider never flew, Goldfinch kept his drawings. These enabled a one-third scale model to be constructed, which was eventually launched from the castle roof in 1993. A set of plans for the glider are in the collection of the Imperial War Museum.

A full-sized replica of the glider was built in 2000 and successfully test flown at RAF Odiham, with Best, Goldfinch and about a dozen of the veterans who had worked on the original present. The replica is now housed on loan at the Gliding Heritage Centre.

== Successful attempts ==
Pat Reid claimed in Colditz: The Full Story that there were 31 "home runs", whereas German authorities cite 30, and some other sources count 36. Reid included prisoners from the hospital and prisoners being transported, who were not directly under Colditz staff control. Henry Chancellor in Colditz: The Definitive History claims 32 escaped, but only 15 were "home runs": 1 Belgian, 11 British, 7 Dutch, 12 French, and 1 Polish. The difference is that Reid claims any successful escape by an "official" Colditz POW a "home run" whereas most other historians only consider escapes from the castle or castle grounds itself as a "home run". Also a subject of debate is whether or not Lieutenant William A. Millar's escape should be considered a "home run", but since he is listed as "Missing in action" (unofficially, he is assumed dead), Chancellor does not count him as such.

At the end of May 1943, the Oberkommando der Wehrmacht ("Armed Forces High Command") decided that Colditz should hold only British and Commonwealth officers. Because of this decision, all of the Dutch and Polish prisoners and most of the French and Belgians were moved to other camps in July. Three British officers tried their luck by impersonating an equal number of French when they were moved out, but they were later returned to Colditz. Several officers tried to escape during transit, having first caused themselves to be transferred for that purpose. German security gradually increased and by the end of 1943 most of the potential ways of escape had been plugged. According to Reid, efforts to escape ceased to be worthwhile once the prospect of an Allied victory (and consequent liberation of the camp) seemed assured — probably around the time of the Normandy landings (D-Day) in June 1944.

Some officers faked illnesses and mental illness in order to be repatriated on medical grounds. A member of the Royal Army Medical Corps (RAMC), Captain Ion Ferguson, wrote a letter to an Irish friend in which he suggested that Ireland join the war; the letter was stopped by the censors, but his wish to be moved elsewhere was granted. In Stalag IV-D he certified a number of prisoners as insane; they were consequently repatriated. He then convinced the Germans of his own insanity and returned to Britain the same way. Four other British officers claimed symptoms of stomach ulcers, insanity, high blood pressure, and back injury in order to be repatriated. There were, in addition, officers who went genuinely insane.

=== From Colditz Castle and grounds ===
1. French Lieutenant Alain Le Ray escaped April 11, 1941. He hid in a terrace house in a park during a game of football. First successful Colditz escapee and first to reach neutral Switzerland.
2. French Lieutenant René Collin escaped May 31, 1941. He climbed into the rafters of a pavilion during exercise, hid there until dark and slipped away. He made it back to France.
3. French Lieutenant Pierre Mairesse Lebrun escaped July 2, 1941. He was captured trying Collin's method. Later vaulted over a wire in the park with the help of an associate. He reached Switzerland in eight days on a stolen bicycle.
4. Dutch Lieutenant Hans Larive escaped August 15, 1941. He hid under a manhole cover in the exercise enclosure, emerged after nightfall, took a train to Gottmadingen, and reached Switzerland in three days.
5. Dutch Lieutenant Francis Steinmetz also escaped August 15, 1941, with Larive
6. Dutch Major C. Giebel escaped September 20, 1941, using the same method as Larive and Steinmetz.
7. Dutch Lieutenant O. L. Drijber escaped September 20, 1941, with Giebel.
8. British Lieutenant Airey M. S. Neave escaped January 5, 1942. Crawled through a hole in a camp theatre (after a prisoner performance) to a guardhouse and marched out dressed as a German soldier. He reached Switzerland two days later. This first successful British escape was a joint British-Dutch effort. Neave later joined MI9.
9. Dutch Lieutenant Anthony Luteyn escaped January 5, 1942, with Neave.
10. Australian Flight Lieutenant Hedley Fowler (RAF) escaped September 9, 1942. Slipped with four others through a guard office and a storeroom dressed as German officers and Polish orderlies. Only he and van Doorninck reached Switzerland. Like Luteyn and Neave, this was another successful British-Dutch effort.
11. Dutch Lieutenant Damiaen Joan van Doorninck escaped September 9, 1942, with Fowler.
12. British Capt. Patrick R. Reid escaped October 14, 1942. Slipped through POW kitchens into the German yard, into the Kommandantur cellar and down to a dry moat through the park. It took him four days to reach Switzerland.
13. Canadian Flight Lieutenant Howard D. Wardle (RAF) escaped October 14, 1942, with Reid.
14. British Major Ronald B. Littledale escaped October 14, 1942. He slipped through POW kitchens into the German yard, into the Kommandantur cellar and down to a dry moat through the park. He reached Switzerland in five days.
15. British Lieutenant-Commander William E. Stephens escaped October 14, 1942, with Littledale.
16. British Lieutenant William A. Millar escaped January, 1944. He broke into the German courtyard and hid in a German truck intending to go to Czechoslovakia. He never reached home and is listed missing on the Bayeux memorial. There is speculation that he was caught and executed in Mauthausen concentration camp as a victim of the secret Kugel-erlass ("Bullet decree") July 15, 1944.

=== From outside Colditz Castle ===
1. French Lieutenants J. Durand-Hornus, G. de Frondeville and J. Prot escaped while on a visit to the town dentist on 17 December 1941.
2. Polish Lieutenant Kroner was transferred to Königswartha Hospital where he jumped out of the window.
3. French Lieutenant Boucheron fled from Zeitz Hospital, was recaptured, and later escaped from Düsseldorf prison.
4. French Lieutenants Odry and Navelet escaped from Elsterhorst Hospital.
5. Belgian Captain Louis Rémy escaped from Gnaschwitz military hospital. His three companions were captured, but he reached Algeciras by boat, and later Britain.
6. British Squadron Leader Brian Paddon escaped to Sweden via Danzig when sent to his previous camp for a court-martial.
7. French Lieutenant Raymond Bouillez escaped from a hospital after an unsuccessful attempt to jump from a train.
8. Dutch Lieutenant J. van Lynden slipped away when the Dutch were moved to Stanislau camp.
9. French Lieutenant A. Darthenay escaped from a hospital at Hohenstein-Ernstthal, later joined the French Resistance, and was killed by the Gestapo on 7 April 1944.
10. Indian RAMC Captain Birendra Nath Mazumdar M.D. was the only Indian in Colditz. He went on a hunger strike to have himself transferred into an Indian-only camp. His wish was granted three weeks later and he escaped from that camp to France and reached Switzerland in 1944 with the aid of the French Resistance.
11. Royal Navy ERAs W. E. "Wally" Hammond (from the sunken submarine HMS Shark) and Don "Tubby" Lister (from the captured submarine HMS Seal) campaigned for a transfer from Colditz, arguing that they were not officers. They were transferred to Lamsdorf prison, escaped from a Breslau work party, and reached England via Switzerland in 1943.

=== "Ghost" prisoners who hid inside Colditz Castle ===
1. British pilot Jack Best, "ghost" from 4 May 1943 to 28 March 1944.
2. Numerous Others

== See also ==
- Christopher Hutton
- Georg Martin Schädlich, Colditz prison guard who kept a diary (posthumously published)

== Sources ==
- Henry Chancellor, Colditz: The Definitive History: The Untold Story of World War II's Great Escapes London: Hodder & Stoughton, 2001.
- Reinhold Eggers, Colditz: The German Story Translated and edited by Howard Gee. London: Robert Hale, 1961.
- Flight to Freedom — The Colditz Glider — An excerpt from the Soaring magazine article on the Colditz Glider by Wade H. Nelson. Retrieved March 21, 2005.
- The Escapes from Colditz — Contains data on the escapees. Retrieved March 19, 2005.
- History of German Currency — A complete history of changes in German Currency. Retrieved April 5, 2005.
