= Anthony Luteyn =

Dutch army officer (1917–2003)

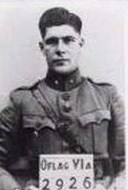
- Born: 10 February 1917; Batavia, Dutch East Indies
- Died: 9 February 2003 (aged 85); The Hague
- Military career
- Allegiance: Netherlands
- Awards: Bronze cross

Abraham Pierre Tony Luteyn (10 February 1917 – 9 February 2003) was a Dutch officer who successfully escaped from the German prisoner of war camp of Colditz. He is sometimes referred to as Anthony Luteyn.

== Start of World War II ==
Luteyn was born at Batavia, Dutch East Indies.

At the outbreak of World War II in the Netherlands, Luteyn was a cadet of the Royal Netherlands East Indies Army (Koninklijk Nederlands Indisch Leger, KNIL) at the Dutch military academy (Koninklijke Militaire Academie, KMA).

After the capitulation of the Dutch armed forces, all of the officers and cadets were asked to give their word of honour not to harm German interests in any way as long as the Netherlands and Germany were at war. When they gave their word of honour, they could go home and live relatively free.

Luteyn refused, together with about 60 other officers, cadets and one rating of the Dutch navy (stoker Willem de Lange). The officers who refused did so for various reasons. Some of them refused because they saw it as conflicting with their officer's oath. Most of the officers who did mot give their word of honour were officers of the Royal Netherlands East Indies Army. They argued that according to their regulations, it was forbidden to give their word of honour, and because the Dutch East Indies were still free at that time, they saw it as their duty to remain in the fight.

All of the final year's cadets were commissioned just before they were led into captivity. Luteyn was thus commissioned as a 2nd lieutenant of engineers in the Royal Netherlands East Indies Army. Because their commission was given hastily and without much ceremony, they were dubbed kasian lieutenant (Malay for "pity lieutenants").

== Prisoner of war ==
Luteyn and all other Dutch officers and cadets who had refused to give their word of honour were thus led into captivity. On 16 July 1940, they were led to their first POW camp Soest Oflag VI A. From this camp, the first Dutch escape attempt was made by Lieutenant Hans Larive, Royal Netherlands Navy. Larive was caught at the Swiss border near Gottmadingen / Singen, but the escape attempt proved to be vital for many future escapes.

After Larive was caught, he was interrogated by a local Gestapo officer. In 1940, Germany was still in an overconfident mood, and the Gestapo officer told Larive where he went wrong and what he should have done to cross the border successfully. Many officers, including Larive himself and Luteyn, later used that information to cross the border successfully.

In November 1940, the group was moved to Juliusburg Oflag VIII C in Amalienstift, an old convent. The convent was partly used as a POW camp, and part was still in use as an orphanage. From this camp, the first successful escape was made by Captain John Trebels and Lieutenant Frans van der Veen, who also used the Gottmadingen–Singen border crossing. As other officers were also busy with escape attempts, which could interfere with each other, Captain Machiel van den Heuvel was appointed as escape officer.

== Colditz ==
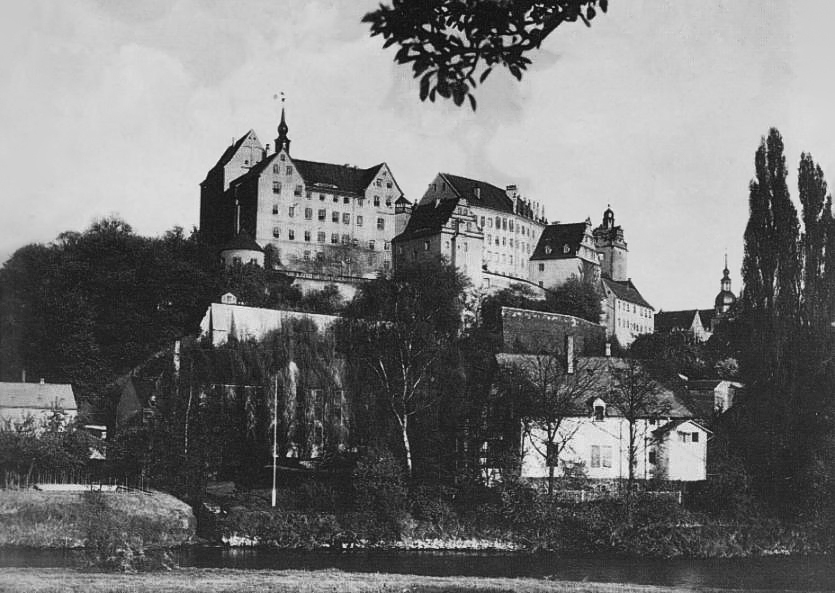
Colditz Castle, prison camp (1945)

After the successful escape by Trebels and van der Veen, the Dutch officers were moved in July 1941 to the POW camp for "special prisoners", sonderlager Oflag IV-C Colditz. At this moment, there were Polish, British, French and Belgian POWs in Colditz. Escape attempts before the Dutch arrived were made. Few were successful; exaples were French Lieutenants Pierre Mairesse Lebrun and Alain Le Ray. In August and September 1941, only one month after arriving in Colditz, the Dutch could claim two successful escapes during which four Dutch officers (Naval Lieutenants Hans Larive and Flanti Steinmetz, Major C. Giebel and Second Lieutenant O. Drijber) escaped to Switzerland.

On 5 January 1942, Luteyn made his successful escape, together with British Lieutenant Airey Neave, who was the first British officer to make it back to Britain from Colditz. In December 1941, the British had discovered a way of escape and posed as two officers dressed in German uniforms. From the third floor from the saalhouse and the theatre, they had made a hole in the floor, which gave access to the attic above the guardroom. As they needed an officer who could speak fluent German, the British asked the Dutch to work together.

Luteyn and Neave were teamed together, and on January 5, 1942, after evening roll call, they were led to the saalhouse by the British escape officer Pat Reid and the Canadian Howard Wardle. Both prospective escapees were dressed in three sets of clothes: first civilian clothes, then German uniform, and finally their own uniform. Through the hole under the theatre, they were led to a tower in which they could reach the stairs to the guardroom. The two escapees had to wait a few minutes so that Reid and Wardle had time to return to the theatre and to camouflage all traces of this escape. Luteyn and Neave cleaned and checked their German uniforms and proceeded downstairs to the German guards. Several guards sprang to attention when "lieutenants" Luteyn and Neave passed them. They went to the park because passing the final guard at the gate required identification, which they did not have. The park, however, was lightly guarded, and there, they climbed the wall without many problems.

After passing the wall, they buried their German uniforms and went to Leisnig, where they took the early train to Leipzig. Targeting a cross into Switzerland via Hans Larive's Singen route, they had to wait for twelve hours before they could continue to Regensburg. To pass the time, they went to a local cinema. They reached Ulm through Regensburg and Augsburg: here they tried to buy a ticket to Engen, a village near Singen. The lady selling train tickets was suspicious and warned the local police. Luteyn and Neave were taken to the local police station and questioned. There, they told their cover story, as Dutchmen working for the Arbeitseinsatz The police only half-believed their story and brought them to the local Arbeitseinsatz building to check their story. They escaped that building and walked 40 km to Biberach, where they took a train to Stockach from where they walked the final kilometres to Singen.

Travelling for three days and living on a few pieces of chocolate and sucking snowballs as drinking water, they were exhausted. They were discovered again by workers and fled and hid in an empty garden shack. There, they tried to sleep on a small bench. When they wanted to leave, they discovered that their shoes were frozen to the floor and so they had to defrost them with their breath. They took a spade and axe to look like local workers. On the evening of the fourth day, they reached the Swiss border. As a police car was checking the local border posts, they could clearly see them. They picked their position and decided to cross the border running. They shook hands and wished each other luck. Running with bleeding blisters and falling and stumbling through snow-covered holes, they reached the village of Ramsen, in Switzerland.

== Post-escape ==
After his successful escape, Luteyn wrote to Captain van den Heuvel about his escape and where to look out, all written in code. He went to Suriname, a Dutch colony at the time, and went to Australia to join the remainder of the Dutch East Indies army there. For his successful escape, Luteyn was awarded the Bronze Cross in 1943. Airey Neave joined MI9 and became a famous Member of Parliament. After the successful escape by Luteyn and Neave, another British-Dutch pairing (Hyde Thompson and Donkers) broke out successfully on 6 January 1942. They escaped from the castle but had the misfortune of being served by the same ticket-sales-woman as Luteyn and Neave had been in Ulm. They were arrested and returned to Colditz.
