= Kenneth Lockwood =

Captain Kenneth Lockwood MBE (17 December 1911 – 8 October 2007) was a stockbroker and an officer in the British Army. He was one of the first six British prisoners of war to arrive at Oflag IV-C, Colditz, in 1940. He made and assisted in numerous escape attempts, working with the chairman of the escape committee, Pat Reid, and was still at the castle when it was liberated by the US Army in April 1945. He was the honorary secretary of the Colditz Association for 50 years.

Lockwood was born in London, the son of a jobber at the London Stock Exchange. He was educated at Whitgift School in Croydon, and then worked for his father's firm in the City of London. He joined the Territorial Army's 22nd (County of London) Battalion of the London Regiment (The Queen's Royal West Surreys) in 1933. He was mobilized in August 1939 and trained at Yeovil before being posted to Le Mans, commanding B company of the 1st/6th Battalion of the Queen's Royal Regiment. After marching with his unit to Belgium, he was captured in the retreat to Dunkirk in May 1940.

He was sent to Oflag VII-C, at Laufen Castle. With six other prisoners, including Pat Reid, he dug a tunnel to escape, thought to be the first escape from a German prisoner of war camp in the Second World War. They escaped in two groups of three, with Reid leading the first group and Lockwood in the second group with Captain Harry Elliott of the Irish Guards and Captain Dick Howe of the Royal Tank Regiment. All six were recaptured and sent to Colditz Castle, where they became the first British prisoners to join three Canadians, who had arrived the previous day, and over 100 Poles, who had been there since September 1939. Lockwood made and assisted in numerous escape attempts, working with the chairman of the escape committee, Pat Reid. Reid was later replaced as escape officer by Dick Howe, and escaped; Lockwood was still at the castle when it was liberated by the US Army in April 1945. He was Mentioned in Despatches in 1946 in recognition of the vital role undertook whilst a POW in both Lauren and Colditz in assisting in many escape bids.

After the war, Lockwood returned to work in the City of London, then moved to work in a Jersey branch office for 10 years. He became the secretary of the Colditz Association, organising regular reunions until the association was wound up in 2006.

In the 1955 film The Colditz Story, based on Reid's book of the same name, Lockwood was played by Richard Wattis. He received an MBE in 1990. He never married.
