= Machiel van den Heuvel =

Dutch soldier

- Born: 7 May 1900; Haarlemmermeer, Netherlands
- Died: 29 June 1946 (aged 46); Padalarang, near Bandung, Java
- Military career
- Allegiance: Netherlands
- Branch: Royal Netherlands East Indies Army
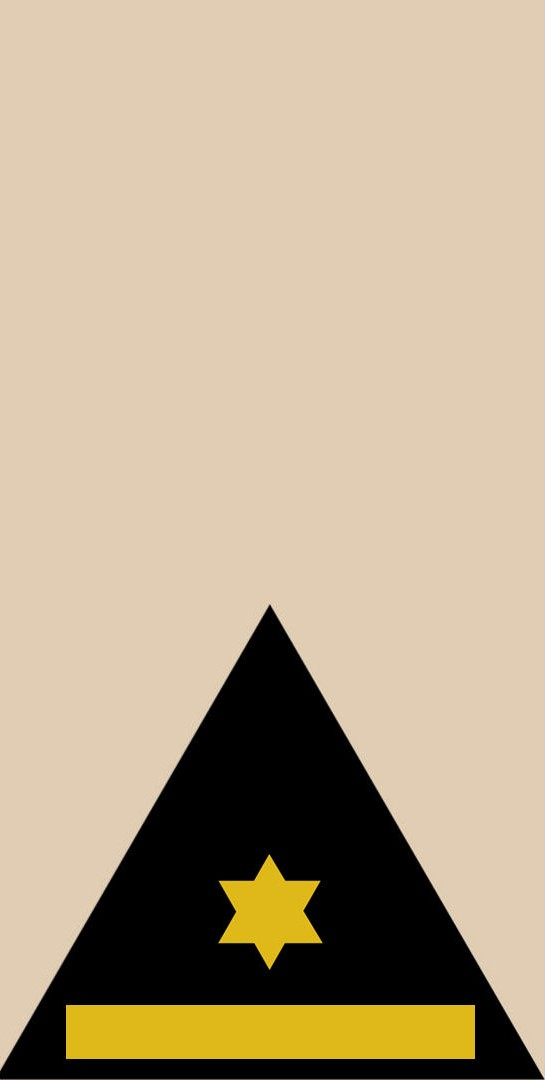
- Rank: Major
- Nickname: Vandy
- Conflicts: World War II; Battle of the Netherlands; Indonesian National Revolution
- Awards: Bronze Cross

Machiel van den Heuvel (7 May 1900 in Haarlemmermeer – 29 June 1946 near Bandung) was a Dutch army officer. As a prisoner-of-war in Oflag IV-C at Colditz Castle, Germany, during World War II, he served as Escape Officer for the Dutch POWs, a role also held by Captain Pat Reid, the author of The Colditz Story, for the British. Van den Heuvel played a key role in most Dutch officer escapes (such as Hans Larive, Francis Steinmetz and Anthony Luteyn) during the war.

== POW ==
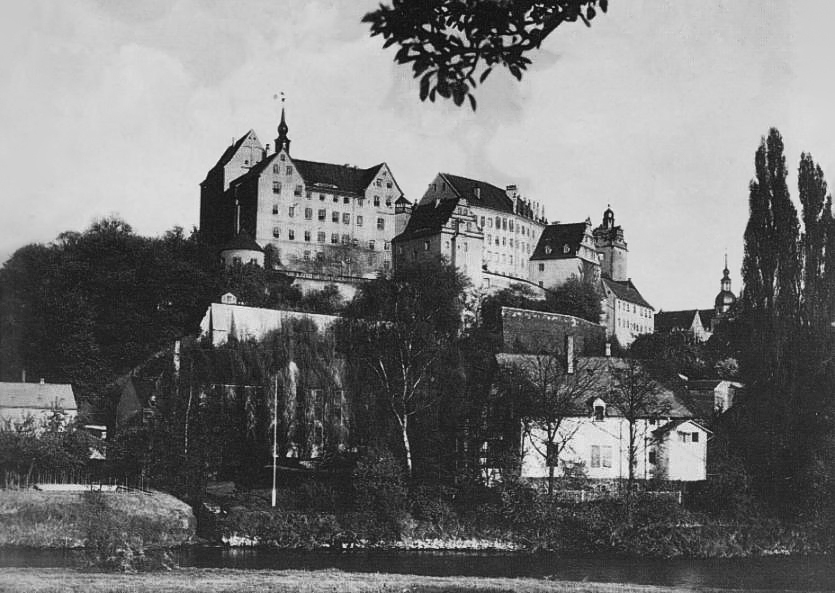
Colditz Castle, where Machiel was imprisoned (1945)

Machiel ("Jim") van den Heuvel, known as "Vandy" by the British POW's, was a captain in the Royal Netherlands East Indies Army (KNIL) who happened to be in the Netherlands at the outbreak of World War II in May 1940. After the Dutch capitulation he refused to give his word of honour not to harm German interests and was sent to a German POW camp. Here van den Heuvel was quickly appointed Escape Officer. Together with Lieutenant Gerrit Dames the two KNIL officers were a main factor for most Dutch escape successes during the war. He discovered the escape route in the park where two men could be hidden in a manhole, Lieutenants Hans Larive, Francis Steinmetz, Lt. Oscar Drijber and Major Cornelis Giebel escaped using this route. Vandy worked together with the other Escape Officers.

In June 1943 all Dutch officers at Colditz were transferred to Stalag 371 in Stanislau to join other Dutch officer POW's. Vandy also claimed many more escapes from this camp. Finally Vandy was transferred to Oflag VII-D at Tittmoning where the Germans thought he could do no more harm because most prisoners were older generals. From Tittmoning Vandy helped Giles Romilly escape. Romilly was a prominent prisoner in Colditz because he was Winston Churchill's nephew.

== After the war ==
After the war, Machiel van den Heuvel was made a major and sent to Java, Indonesia to fight in the Indonesian war of independence. He was a battalion commander when he was killed in action at Padalarang, Java, on 29 June 1946. He had been awarded the Bronze Cross for his actions.

== On film ==
In the film The Colditz Story (1955), directed by Guy Hamilton, the role of Vandy was played by actor Theodore Bikel.

== See also ==
- List of attempts to escape Oflag IV-C
