= Damiaen Joan van Doorninck =

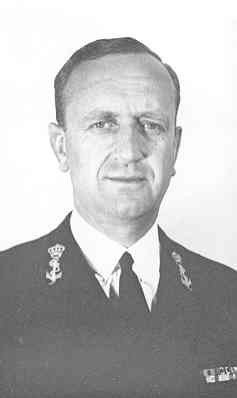
Damiaen Joan van Doorninck between 1951 and 1953

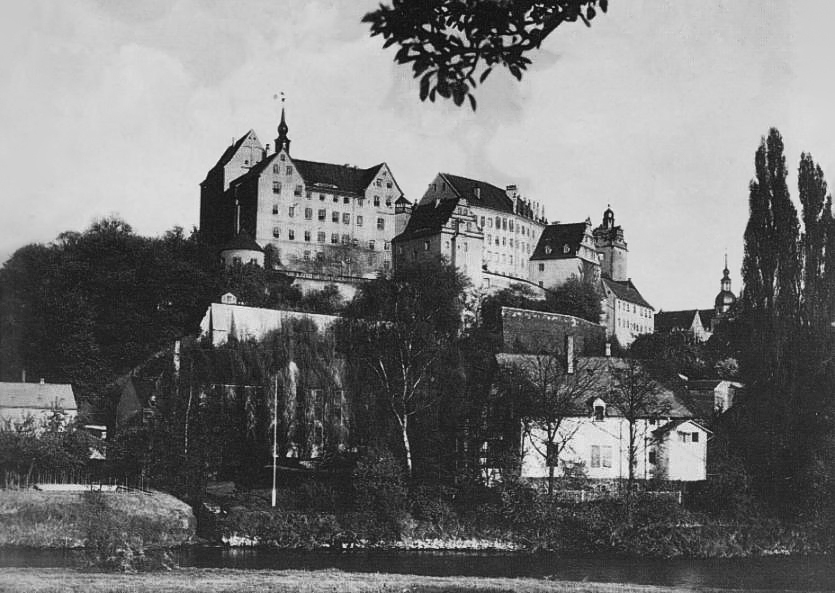
Colditz Castle (1945)

Damiaen J. van Doorninck (29 August 1902 – 24 September 1987) was a Dutch officer (lieutenant commander in the Royal Netherlands Navy Reserve) and a prisoner of war in Colditz.

== POW ==
Doorninck was born in Vught, Netherlands in 1902. In May 1940 he was aide de camp to the Dutch supreme commander, General Henri Winkelman. He refused to give his word of honour not to harm German interest and became a PoW. He was conversant in cosmography and advanced mathematics, and he lectured interested Dutch and British prisoners at Oflag IV-C in Colditz Castle on both, in particular he taught geodesy to Pat Reid.

While in Colditz, he invented a device which, when attached to a micrometer, could obtain measurements accurate to within a tenth of a millimetre of any lock. He was therefore able to manufacture a key to fit any such lock in Colditz. He lectured other prisoners on how to use this device correctly, a course that lasted six months.

On 9 September 1942 van Doorninck and British Lieutenant Hedley Fowler were among the lucky few who escaped Colditz. Slipping with four others through a guard office and a storeroom dressed as German officers and Polish orderlies, they managed to make it out of the Castle. Only van Doorninck and Fowler reached Switzerland; the others were recaptured.

Doorninck died in Mynachlog-ddu, Wales in 1987.
