= Hank Wardle =

Canadian Air Force pilot (1915–1995)

Howard Douglas Wardle MC (15 August 1915 – 30 January 1995), commonly known as Hank, was a Canadian pilot in the Royal Air Force during World War II. He is notable for being (along with the "Medium Sized Man", Dominic Bruce) one of the only two men who escaped from both Spangenberg and Colditz prison camps during World War II.

Wardle was born in Dauphin, Manitoba, Canada. Wardle joined the Royal Air Force in December 1938. After completing pilot training, he joined No. 218 Squadron with the rank of Pilot Officer at Auberive-sur-Suippes, France on 29 November 1939.

Pilot Officer Wardle was shot down near Crailsheim, Germany on 20 April 1940 while conducting a reconnaissance mission in a Fairey Battle light bomber. He was the only member of the crew of three to survive bailing out of the aircraft and after being interrogated at a nearby Luftwaffe base was transferred to the POW camp Oflag IX-A/H at Spangenberg Castle. While a prisoner at this camp, Wardle made the first of his escapes but was recaptured after 24 hours on the run.

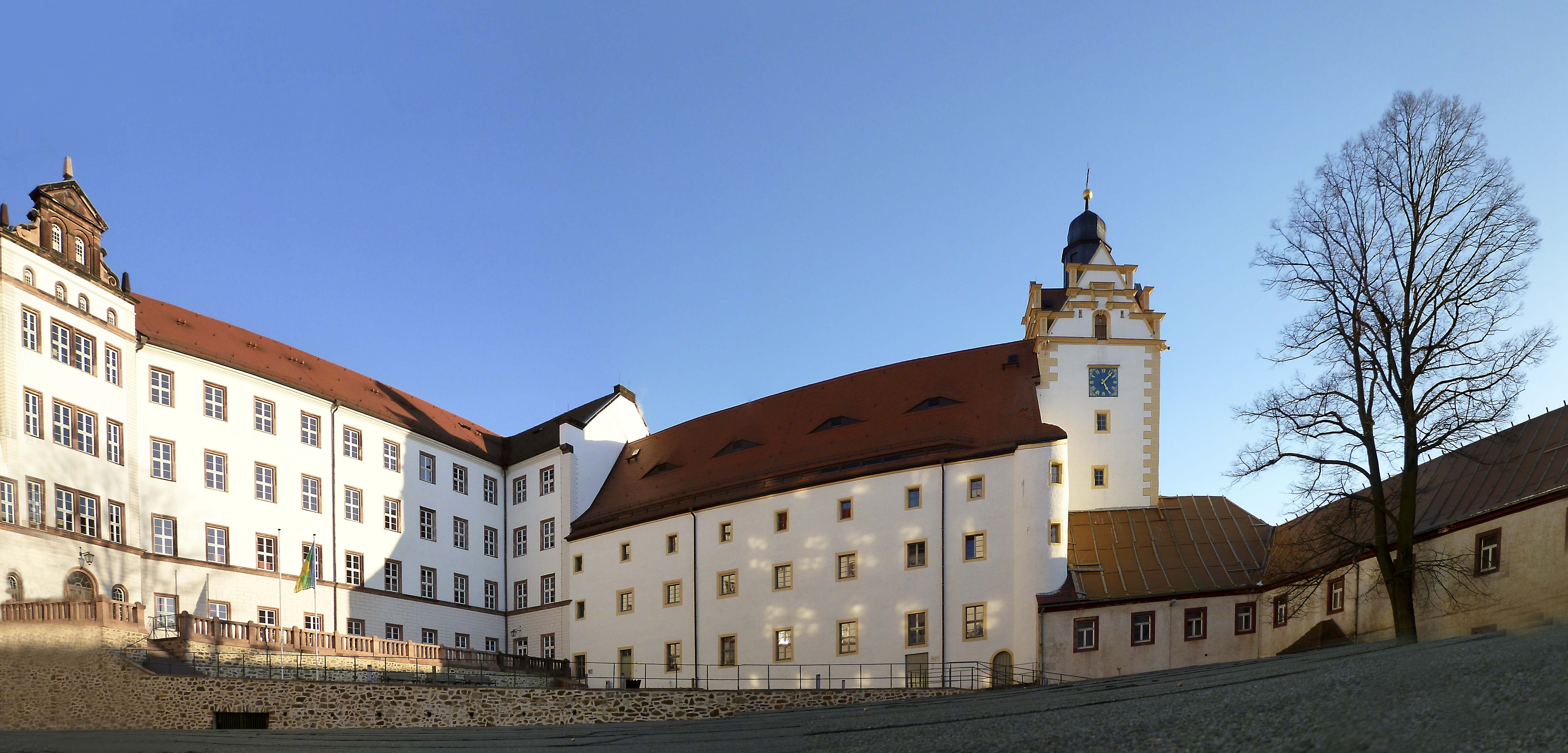
The German Kommandantur in 2011. This yard holds the cellar they escaped from

After recapture, he was moved to Oflag IVc at Colditz Castle. On 14 October 1942, Wardle, along with Captain Pat Reid, Major Ronald B. Littledale, and Lieutenant Commander L. W. Stephens, successfully escaped from Colditz. Wardle and Reid went via Hans Larive's Singen route to cross the Swiss frontier on 18 October with Littledale and Stephens arriving on 19 October. Their escape was later recounted in Reid's book, Colditz Story (1953). In late 1943 the British military attaché in Bern made arrangements with his Dutch counterpart for Wardle to make the clandestine journey to Spain with the Dutch-Paris escape line. That meant that the British paid for Wardle's expenses such as train fare, black market food and lodging and the passeur over the Pyrenees. Dutch-Paris smuggled Wardle into France near Geneva and took him by train to Toulouse. He walked over the Pyrenees in a convoy that included two Italians, three Frenchmen and seven Dutchmen under the guidance of two French passeurs, Henri Marot "Mireille" and Pierre Treillet "Palo". They encountered snow in the passes and constant rain, leaving the men exhausted when they reached the Spanish village of Canejan in the days before Christmas 1943. Wardle returned to England via Gibraltar on 5 February 1944.

Flight Lieutenant Wardle was awarded the Military Cross, registered in the London Gazette on 16 May 1944. He died in 1995 in Ottawa.
