= Dick Howe =

British Army officer

Captain Richard Herbert Howe MBE MC
- Born: 21 June 1912; Arecife, Brazil
- Died: 1 June 1981 (aged 68); Royal Tunbridge Wells, England
- Military career
- Allegiance: United Kingdom
- Branch: British Army
- Rank: Captain
- Conflicts: World War II
- Awards: MBE; Military Cross

Captain Richard Herbert Howe MBE, MC (21 June 1912 – 21 June 1981) was a British army officer during World War II.< He was captured by the Germans in 1940 and eventually held in Oflag IV-C, at Colditz Castle, where he served as Escape Officer from 1942 to 1945. He organised many escapes including eight successful home runs of British officers.

Lt. Col. Moran of the Colditz Association described him as 'an outstanding chap, the soul of Colditz. In a crisis he was the most calm individual and he had enormous reserves of will power'.

== Life ==
Richard Herbert Howe was born on 21 June 1912 in Brazil, the son of Charles Herbert Howe and Ethyl Jeannie Maud Howe (née Nichols). He was educated at Bedford Modern School between 1920 and 1930.

Howe served as a lance corporal on the Officers' Training Corps at Bedford and was commissioned as a second lieutenant in the Royal Tank Corps on 13 May 1933. After a short period of time with the Royal Tank Corps, he worked in radio manufacturing for Kolster-Brandes Limited, A.C. Cossor Limited and Truphonic Radio Limited. At the outbreak of World War II he rejoined the 3rd Battalion Royal Tank Regiment.

In 1940, Howe was serving in the British Expeditionary Force, as a lieutenant, and temporary captain, in the 3rd Royal Tank Regiment, when he was awarded the Military Cross while defending troops evacuating Calais.

After being captured following the Siege of Calais, he was imprisoned at Oflag VII-C at Laufen. Howe was one of six British officers who escaped, but were eventually recaptured. Howe and the rest of the "Laufen Six" — Harry Elliott, Rupert Barry (later Sir Rupert Barry), Pat Reid, Anthony "Peter" Allan and Kenneth Lockwood — were then sent to Colditz. Howe later replaced Reid as Escape Officer, co-ordinating all escape plans, after Reid himself escaped in October 1942. He organised many escapes including eight successful home runs of British officers.

Howe remained a prisoner until the end of the war, but his efforts were recognized by being made a Member of the Order of the British Empire in June 1946. Howe died in hospital in Tunbridge Wells, Kent in 1981.
