= Ion Ferguson =

Irish soldier

- Ion Ferguson with RAF 30 Squadron, Greece 1941
- Born: Thomas Ion Victor Ferguson; 1913; Knockcloghrim, County Londonderry, Ireland
- Died: 1990 (aged 76–77); Rochdale, Lancashire
- Spouse: Eileen May O'Brien
- Military career
- Allegiance: United Kingdom
- Branch: Royal Army Medical Corps
- Service years: 1939–1945
- Conflicts: World War II

Thomas Ion Victor Ferguson known as Ion Ferguson Royal Army Medical Corps (1913–1990) was an Irish volunteer in the British army who escaped from Oflag IV-C, Colditz Castle, during the Second World War.

== Early life ==
Born on 21 April 1913 in Knockcloghrim, County Londonderry, Ireland, he was the son of Ion Ferguson (1882–1962) and Annie Victoria Makin Ferguson, née Fisher (1887–1969), who married in August 1912. His father died in 1962 at the age of 79, and his mother died in 1969 at the age of 81. His father's brother was Sidney Clement Ferguson (Belfast, 1918–1973). In 1939, at the outbreak of World War II, the family moved to Croft House in Church Street, Whitworth, Lancashire, a small town north of Rochdale. Sidney died on 24 March 1973, in Rainhill, Lancashire, at the age of 55. Ion was married to Eileen May O'Brien.

== RAF 30 Squadron and German capture ==
Ferguson was with RAF 30 Squadron, based in Eleusis, Greece, from November 1940 and contributed to the Greek defense against the Italians. After the German invasion, the squadron evacuated to Crete until 15 May 1941, and then back to Egypt with the three remaining airworthy Blenheim aircraft. He was captured by the Germans in 1941 and held as a POW until 1945.

He was moved to Colditz Castle after protesting the German authorities' mistreatment of the POWs. According to Punch magazine, "Dr. Ferguson is a typical Irish rebel who kicked against the authority of senior officers until becoming a POW, when he would not allow the Germans to ill-treat anyone without voluble protest. His intransigence landed him in Colditz ..."

At Colditz, Ferguson sought to attract the attention of the German authorities by writing a letter to an Irish friend, the son of Éamon de Valera, the Irish Taoiseach, calling for Ireland to join the Allies in the war. The German censors intercepted the letter and moved him to Stalag IV-D. There, he coached two RAF prisoners to convincingly simulate schizophrenia, resulting in their repatriation. He awaited his own repatriation to Britain in the same manner.

== Biography and death ==
Ferguson wrote an autobiography of his wartime experiences entitled Doctor at War (1955 UK edition).

Ferguson died in 1990 at the age of 77. His funeral was held in Rochdale, Lancashire.

== Bibliography ==
- Doctor at War, Christopher Johnson Publishers Ltd, London (1955)
- Doctor at War, Panther Books, (1957)
