= The Colditz Story =

1955 British film by Guy Hamilton

- Cinema release poster
- Directed by: Guy Hamilton
- Written by: Guy Hamilton; Ivan Foxwell
- Based on: The Colditz Story by Pat Reid
- Produced by: Ivan Foxwell
- Starring: John Mills; Eric Portman; Christopher Rhodes; Ian Carmichael; Lionel Jeffries
- Cinematography: Gordon Dines
- Edited by: Peter Mayhew
- Music by: Francis Chagrin
- Production company: Ivan Foxwell Productions
- Distributed by: British Lion Films
- Release date: 25 January 1955
- Running time: 93 minutes
- Country: United Kingdom
- Language: English
- Budget: £136,000 or $600,000

The Colditz Story is a 1955 British prisoner of war film starring John Mills and Eric Portman and directed by Guy Hamilton. It is based on the 1952 memoir written by Pat Reid, a British army officer who was imprisoned in Oflag IV-C, Colditz Castle, in Germany during the Second World War and who was the Escape Officer for British POWs within the castle.

== Plot ==
During World War II, the Germans transform Colditz Castle into a high-security prisoner-of-war camp called Oflag IV-C. Its purpose is to restrain those Allied prisoners who have attempted to escape from other Oflags. Colditz houses first Polish, then British, Dutch and French prisoners. Among the British are Pat Reid and Senior British Officer Colonel Richmond. Richmond is warned by the Kommandant that "escaping is verboten" but Richmond has no intention of heeding this advice. All the prisoners are wary of Priem, the chief security officer, who is efficient and tenacious.

Reid and other British officers attempt to open a manhole cover one night but a simultaneous French attempt and the ensuing confusion alerts the German guards. Reid and La Tour (a French officer) argue about the lack of co-operation, both blaming the other. Later, a British tunnel is making progress until it meets another being dug by the Dutch officers, and a collapse occurs. Richmond proposes the selection of an escape officer from each nationality to make sure attempts do not interfere with each other. This would be on the understanding that the escape officers cannot themselves take part in an escape. Reid accepts the post for the British contingent.

Richmond concocts an escape plan, which hinges on his impersonation of a feldwebel nicknamed "Franz Josef" for his resemblance to the former Austrian emperor. This seems to be succeeding until, at the key moment, the German guards emerge and arrest all concerned. Harry Tyler, disguised as a German goon, is shot and wounded trying to escape. Richmond, Reid and a dozen others are placed in solitary for a month and the likelihood of an informer is discussed.

Soon after being released, Jimmy Winslow is hidden among palliasses being taken out of the castle and is not immediately caught. A Polish officer, whose family have been threatened by the Gestapo, is soon found to be collaborating with the guards. While his own people condemn him to death, the Kommandant - at Richmond's urging - transfers him away.

After two weeks on the run, Winslow is recaptured and returned to Colditz. While he is in the solitary compound, he talks to La Tour, who's in for goon bating, during a physical exercise session and watches as La Tour, helped by a compatriot, leaps over the barbed wire fence. Winslow runs into a guard to throw off his aim, and La Tour runs to freedom. Soon afterwards, Richmond expresses annoyance that no British officer has yet made a complete escape.

Reid's friend 'Mac' McGill approaches Richmond with a new plan but says he will only disclose it if Richmond will relieve Reid from his escape officer duties so that he and Reid can make the attempt together. Richmond agrees, and McGill convinces Reid that the plan is feasible. McGill argues that previous attempts have failed because the escapees came from the wrong direction. The escapees will be disguised as German officers, but will approach the guards from the direction of the German mess. The attempt will coincide with a revue being staged in the castle theatre, to which all senior German officers will be invited.

McGill is very tall and has antagonised the guards many times by reckless behaviour. Richmond realises that he will be too conspicuous and asks him to stand down so that the others selected will have a good chance of making the plan work. McGill accepts Richmond's reasoning but is devastated. Next day, he scales the wire fence surrounding the exercise compound in broad daylight and is shot dead by the guards. Reid, on learning of Richmond's decision, refuses to join the escape attempt but Richmond persuades him to do so, arguing that McGill's life will have been wasted otherwise. The escape goes ahead as planned during the revue. Reid, Winslow, Tyler and Dutchman Lutyens get out of the castle, but Tyler and Lutyens are soon recaptured. Several days later, Richmond receives a postcard with a cryptic message. He announces to the assembled and cheering prisoners that Reid and Winslow have successfully crossed into neutral Switzerland.

== Cast ==
Information sourced to the BFI site.

- John Mills as Pat Reid
- Eric Portman as Colonel Richmond
- Frederick Valk as Kommandant
- Denis Shaw as Priem
- Lionel Jeffries as Harry Tyler
- Christopher Rhodes as Mac McGill
- Richard Wattis as Richard Gordon
- Ian Carmichael as Robin Cartwright
- Bryan Forbes as Jimmy Winslow
- Theodore Bikel as "Vandy", Machiel van den Heuvel
- Eugene Deckers as La Tour
- Anton Diffring as Hauptmann Fischer
- Guido Lorraine as Polish officer
- Witold Sikorski as Polish Officer
- A. Blichewicz as Polish Officer
- B. Dolinski as Polish Officer
- Leo Bieber as German Interpreter
- Rudolph Offenbach as Dutch Colonel
- Keith Pyott as French colonel
- Arthur Butcher as Polish Colonel
- David Yates as Dick
- Douglas Argent as British Officer
- Terence Brook as British Officer
- Frank Coburn as British Officer
- Eric Corrie as British Officer
- John Corrie as British Officer
- Anthony Faramus as British officer
- Eric Lander as British Officer
- Kenneth Midwood as British Officer
- Peter Myers as British Officer
- Claude Le Sache as French Interpreter
- Zygmunt Rewkowski as Polish Interpreter
- Carl Duering as Hauptmann Wagner
- Ludwik Lawiński as Franz Josef
- Peter Swanwick (credited as "Swannick") as Lutyens
- John Heller as German Guard
- Jean Driant as French Orderly
- Jean Bacon as French Orderly
- Frederick Schiller as German Soldier
- Guy Deghy as German Soldier

== Production ==
The theatre revue towards the end of the film, which the inmates use to mask the escape by Reid and Winslow, begins with a parody of the Will Fyffe song "I Belong to Glasgow", rendered "I Belong to Colditz". Ian Carmichael and Richard Wattis, playing two Guards officers, perform a Flanagan and Allen routine, based on the song "Underneath the Arches".

== Reception ==
The film was the fourth most popular film at the British box office in 1955. According to Kinematograph Weekly it was a "money maker" at the British box office in 1955. It recouped its cost in Britain alone after five months. However the film performed poorly at the US box office, like most British war movies of this era.

A BBC television series, Colditz, was based on Reid's book and broadcast 1972–74. It starred David McCallum, Robert Wagner, Jack Hedley and Edward Hardwicke.

== See also ==
- List of British films of 1955
