= Francis Steinmetz =

Dutch naval officer and Colditz escaper

- Born: Franciscus Steinmetz; 20 September 1914; Batavia, Netherland East Indies
- Died: 2 January 2006 (aged 91)
- Military career
- Allegiance: Netherlands
- Branch: Royal Netherlands Navy
- Service years: 1932–1959
- Rank: Kapitein Luitenant ter Zee (commander)
- Awards: Bronze Cross (Netherlands)

Francis Steinmetz (20 September 1914 – 2 January 2006) was an officer in the Royal Netherlands Navy who escaped from Oflag IV-C, Colditz Castle, a German POW camp, during World War II, making a "home run" to safety.

== Early life ==
Steinmetz was born 20 September 1914 in Batavia, Dutch East Indies and entered the Dutch Royal Navy in September 1932. After periods on various boats he was posted to the submarine service. He was captured in 1940 in Amsterdam by advancing German forces.

Initially sent to a prison camp at Soest, Germany, Steinmetz was then transferred to a POW camp Silesia. He refused to sign a German parole saying he would refrain from any hostile act towards Germany and was transferred to Sonderlager IVC, at Colditz Castle.

=== Escaping Colditz ===
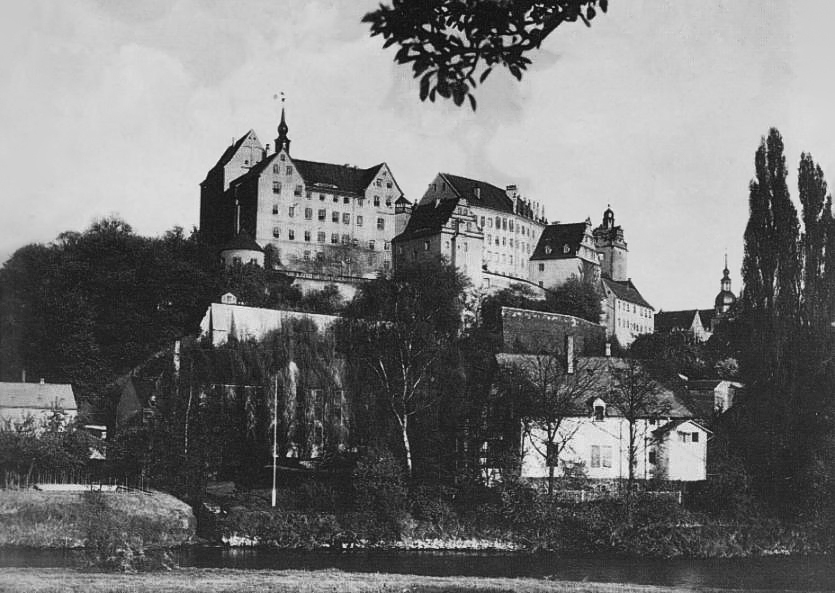
Colditz Castle, prison camp (1945)

At Colditz all Dutch escapes were coordinated by the Dutch escape officer Captain Machiel van den Heuvel, known as "Vandy" by the British. Van den Heuvel quickly recognised the possibilities of the exercise park and soon had his first escape plan ready. On 15 August 1941 Steinmetz and Hans Larive hid under a manhole cover under the cover of a rugby scrum. Lieutenant Gerrit Dames then created a diversion by cutting a hole in the barbed wire fence, before allowing himself to be caught, shouting to imaginary escapers to run, so that the Germans would think that the missing officers had already escaped.

Larive and Steinmetz hid for several hours. The cover was fixed with a heavy bolt, which Van den Heuvel had replaced with a fake made of glass. Once it was dark the two men forced the manhole cover open from below, and replaced the now broken glass bolt with the original one. They then made their way out of the castle. (This escape method was repeated on 20 September 1941 by two other Dutch officers, C. Giebel and O. L. Drijber.). At Leisnig Steinmetz and Larive took a train to Nuremberg where they waited for their next train in a nearby park. To avoid attracting unwanted attention, they pretended to be a courting couple, with Steinmetz pulling a blanket down over his shorts so it looked like a skirt. They crossed the Swiss border on 18 August 1941.

Under Swiss neutrality law they were not allowed to leave the country, so the Dutch Legation provided false papers describing them as sugar planters on their way to Cuba. They travelled on a sealed train in which neutrals were able to pass through France into Spain. At Barcelona they boarded the neutral ship, Isla de Teneriffe, sailing for Havana. The ship was intercepted by a Royal Navy cutter in the Strait of Gibraltar and the two men were taken off and arrived in Gibraltar on 4 November. They then sailed to England aboard the submarine HNLMS O 21 and arrived in London on 17 December 1941.

After interrogation by the British, Steinmetz served on motor torpedo boats, taking MTB 222 to the West Indies. He later commanded Dutch motor torpedo boats in the Far East.

== Post-war career ==
After the end of the Second World War, Steinmetz returned to Holland and served at the naval training camp at Hilversum. In December 1950, he commanded the minesweeper Boeroe in Dutch New Guinea, before returning to the naval training centre at Voorschoten.

Steinmetz later commanded the minesweeper De Bitter and the frigate De Zeeuw, before joining the Dutch Ministry of Naval Affairs. His final ship was the destroyer Limburg.

After retiring, Steinmetz worked for Ole Anderson in Denmark, making fan impellers.

== Family ==
Steinmetz married twice, first in 1946 to Regina Henrietta Noren (until her death in 1974); and then Peggy George, who predeceased him. He had one son during his first marriage; and two step-daughters by his second.
