= Pierre Mairesse-Lebrun =

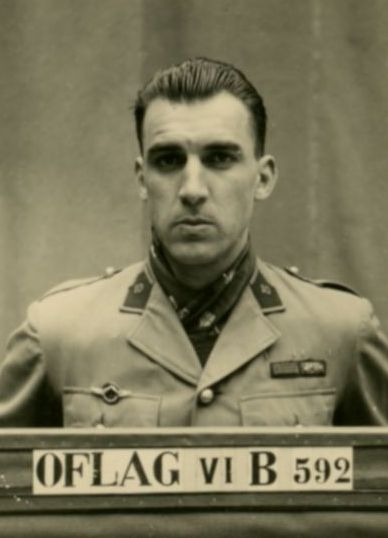
Pierre Mairesse-Lebrun as prisoner of war in Germany in 1941

Pierre Marie Jean-Baptiste Mairesse-Lebrun (16 March 1912 – 6 December 2003) was a French Army cavalry officer who became famous for his escape from Colditz castle as a World War II prisoner of war. He was born in Bauzy, Loir-et-Cher.

Lebrun served as a captain in the 4th regiment Chasseurs de l'Afrique and was captured during the Fall of France. He was sent to Oflag IV-C, at Colditz Castle, from which he escaped on 2 July 1941.

After a walk in the park all POWs gathered to be counted and be escorted back to the main castle. At this moment all guards, who stood around the park fences, also returned to the park entrance, leaving the back fences unguarded. Mairesse Lebrun and Lieutenant Pierre Odry used this opportunity to leave the group, and together they ran to the fence at the backside of the park. Odry catapulted Mairesse Lebrun over the fence where he ran away. The German guards were so stunned that they did nothing initially; when they recovered, they started shooting without any successful hits. Still in his sports clothes, Lebrun stole a bike and peddled along the autobahn shirtless until the wheels broke, he reached a field, where he approached a girl carrying milk to a chalet. He made it to Switzerland. Later via Switzerland he reached Vichy France.

In December 1941 he went to Spain, where he was arrested. He tried to escape again but fractured his spine paralysing his legs.

On 20 July 1946 he married Christine Solvay (1922–2006).

Lebrun was created a Commandeur de la Légion d'honneur.

== Sources ==
- Leo de Hartog; Officieren achter prikkeldraad 1940-1945, uitgeverij hollandia 1983
- Entry at Planète Généalogie
- Henry Chancellor, Colditz: The Definitive History, London 2001, "based on television programmes produced for Channel Four Television", ISBN 0340794941, pp. 51–58.
