= Stalag IV-D =

- Torgau, Saxony

Site information
- Type: Prisoner-of-war camp
- Controlled by: Nazi Germany

Location
- Germany, 1937
- Location within Germany
- Coordinates: 51.5603°N 12.9898°E

Site history
- In use: 1941–1945

Garrison information
- Occupants: Mainly French and British POWs

Stalag IV-D was a German World War II prisoner-of-war camp located in the town of Torgau, Saxony, about 50 km (31 mi) north-east of Leipzig.

== Camp history ==
The camp comprised two buildings located in the town. The main camp was located on Naundorfer Strasse, about 275 metres (300 yd) south-west of the railway station. Originally a small print factory it was requisitioned for use as a POW camp in May 1941. For most of the war the camp held only around 800 POWs, as most were assigned to Arbeitslager ("Work Camps") in factories, mines, railway yards, and farms, up to 160 kilometres (100 mi) away. There was also an administration building on the corner of Wolfersdorff and Puschkin Strassen, formerly a school for Army NCOs, with a small compound of wooden huts that housed around 20 POWs assigned to clerical duties.

A sub-camp, Stalag IV-D/Z, was opened in May 1942, located in Annaburg about 20 km (12 mi) north of Torgau. From March 1944 it was designated as a Heilag (short for Heimkehrerlager), a repatriation camp for POWs waiting to be either exchanged or returned home on medical grounds.

The camps were liberated in late April 1945 when US and Soviet forces met on the Elbe at Torgau.

=== Post–World War II ===
After the war, the Soviet secret police agency NKVD established its Special Camps Nos. 8 and 10 in Fort Zinna and in the nearby Seydlitz barracks. Germans and some Soviet citizens were interned here or served sentences passed by the Soviet military tribunals. The East German People's Police used the Fort Zinna prison from 1950 to 1990 as a penitentiary. In the 1950s it primarily housed political prisoners.

The Torgau Documentation and Information Center (DIZ), founded in 1991 and now under the administration of the Saxon Memorial Foundation for the commemoration of the victims of political despotism, researches and presents the history of the Torgau prisons in the permanent exhibition "Traces of Injustice".

== Notable prisoners ==
- Albert Mullard

== See also ==
- List of prisoner-of-war camps in Germany
