= Pat Reid =

British Army officer, prisoner of war, author (1910–1990)

Patrick Robert Reid
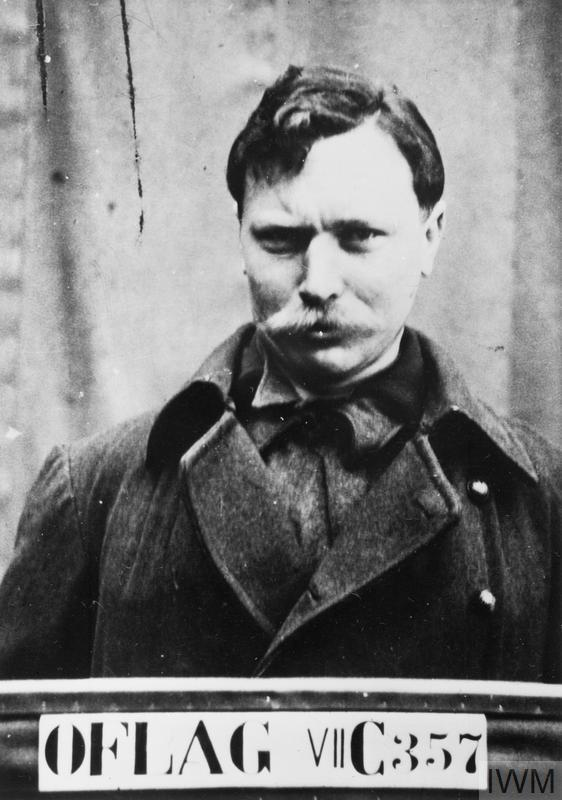
- German identity photograph of Captain Pat Reid taken shortly before he was transferred to Colditz.
- Born: 13 November 1910; Ranchi, Bengal Presidency, British India
- Died: 22 May 1990 (aged 79); Frenchay Hospital, Bristol, England
- Military career
- Allegiance: United Kingdom
- Branch: British Army
- Service years: 1933–1947
- Rank: Major
- Nickname: "Pat"
- Service number: 58974
- Unit: Royal Army Service Corps
- Conflicts: World War II: Battle of France
- Awards: Member of the Order of the British Empire; Military Cross
- Other work: Diplomat, administrator, company director & author

Patrick Robert Reid, MBE, MC (13 November 1910 – 22 May 1990) was a British Army officer and author of history. As a British prisoner of war during the Second World War, he was held captive at Colditz Castle when it was designated Oflag IV-C. Reid was one of the few to escape from Colditz, crossing the border into neutral Switzerland in late 1942.

After the war Reid was a diplomat and administrator before eventually returning to his prewar career in civil engineering. He also wrote about his experiences in two best-selling books, which became the basis of a film, TV series and board game.

== Early life and education ==
Patrick Reid was born in Ranchi, India, the son of John Reid CIE ICS, of Carlow, Ireland, and Alice Mabel Daniell. He was educated at St. Dominic's Preparatory School, Cabra, County Dublin, Clongowes Wood College, County Kildare, and Wimbledon College, London, and graduated from King's College London in 1932. He then trained as a civil engineer, working for Sir Alexander Gibb & Partners from 1934 to 1937, and becoming an Associate Member of the Institution of Civil Engineers in 1936.

== Military service ==
Reid joined the Territorial Army and was commissioned as a Second Lieutenant on 16 June 1933 on the General List. He joined the Royal Army Service Corps (Supplementary Reserve) with the same rank on 5 June 1935. He was promoted to Lieutenant exactly three years later on 5 June 1938.

Reid was mobilised for active duty on 24 August 1939, and served in the 2nd Infantry Division, receiving promotion to Temporary Captain on 1 December 1939. On 27 May 1940, while serving as a member of the British Expeditionary Force during the Battle of France, he was captured by the Germans near Cassel. He was sent to Laufen castle, Bavaria, designated Oflag VII-C, arriving there on 5 June 1940.

Within days of his arrival, Reid was planning an escape, determined to return home by Christmas. After seven weeks digging Reid and a group of prisoners completed a tunnel, 24 feet (7.3 m) long, from the prison basement to a small shed adjoining a nearby house. At 06:30 on 5 September 1940, Reid and five others broke out and made for Yugoslavia, only 150 miles away.

Initially they made some progress walking across country at night, but as they entered more mountainous terrain they were forced onto the roads. The escapees were recaptured after five days in Radstadt, Austria, travelling around 50 miles. They were stopped by some locals; one of the escapees spoke fluent German, and by himself he might have bluffed it, but as they did not have any identification and the others did not speak German the locals became too suspicious. Reid was sentenced to a month of solitary confinement, on a diet of bread and water.

As one of the "Laufen Six", Reid was then sent to Colditz Castle, designated Oflag IV-C, a special "escape-proof" camp, arriving there on 10 November 1940.

He bribed a seemingly willing German guard to look the other way. On the night of 29 May 1941 twelve prisoners crawled through a sewer pipe from the canteen to an outer courtyard, planning to then descend a forty-foot wall, and then over another wall 12 feet high topped with barbed wire. However, although the guard had accepted the bribe, he also reported the escape plan to his superiors, and the Germans were waiting for them.

After another spell in solitary, Reid accepted the position of Escape Officer, responsible for overseeing all British escape plans. Reid assisted in many escape attempts, some successful, until April 1942, when he was replaced as Escape Officer by fellow member of the "Laufen Six" Captain Richard "Dick" Howe.

=== Escaping Colditz ===
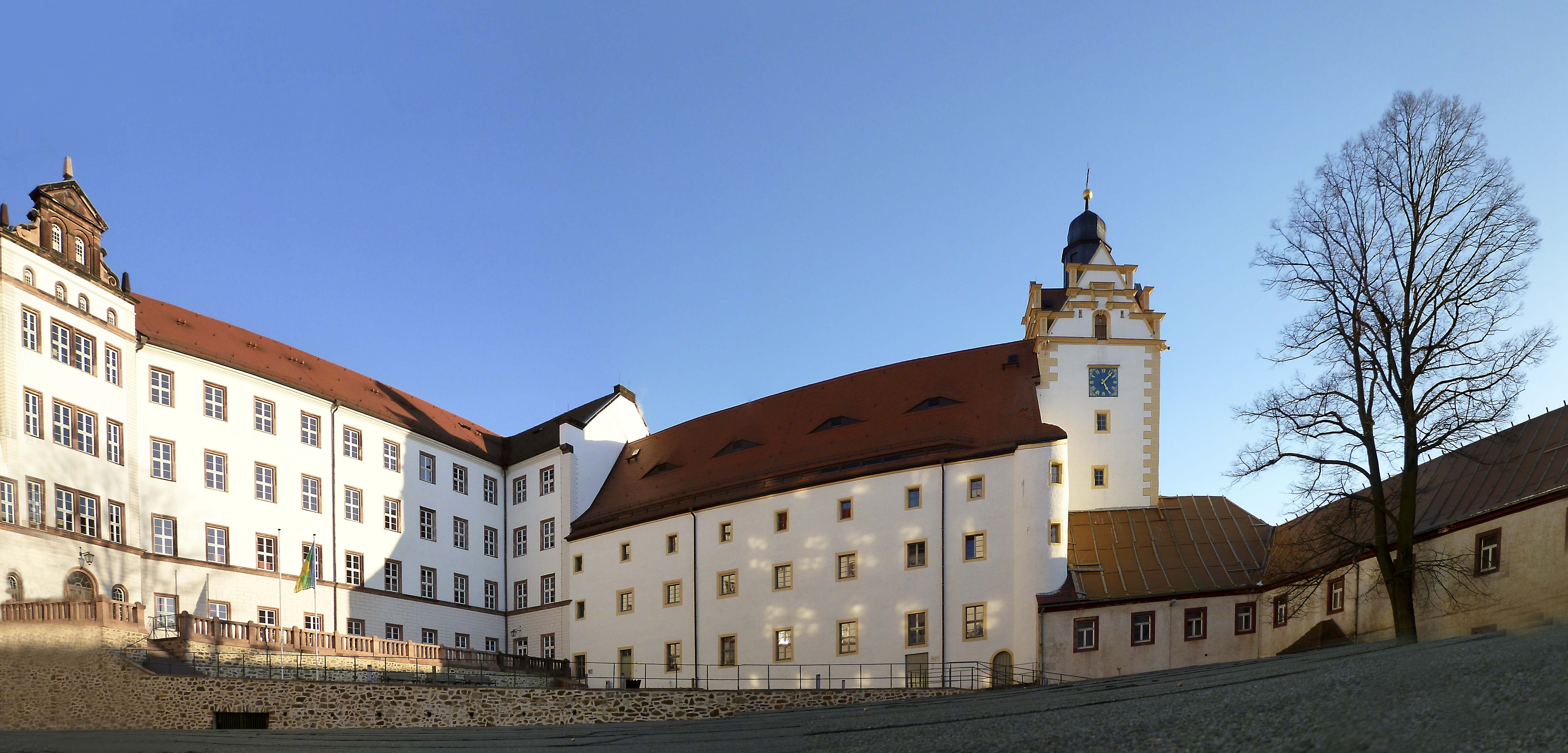
The German Kommandantur in 2011.

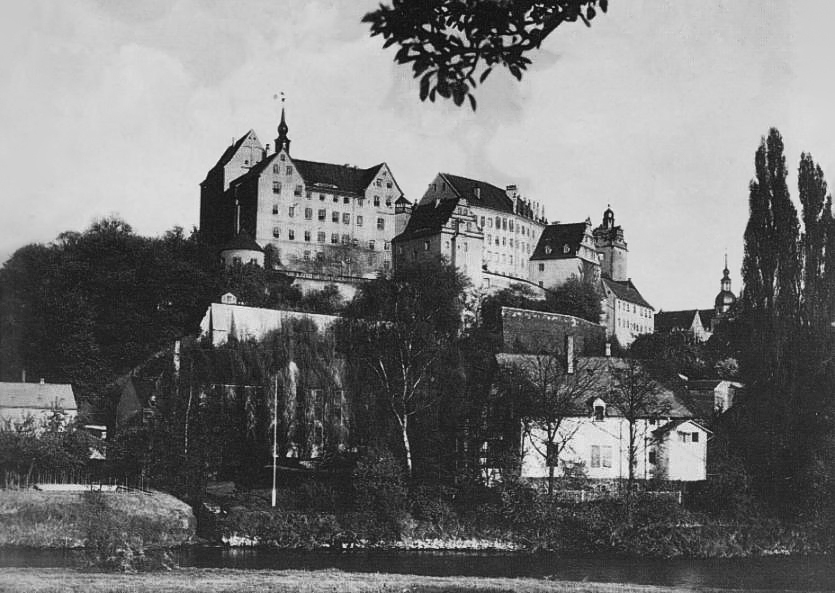
Colditz Castle (1945)

Reid finally took his own chance to escape on the night of 14/15 October 1942, along with Major Ronald Littledale, Lieutenant Commander William L. Stephens RNVR, and Flight Lieutenant Howard Wardle RAF. They cut through the bars on a window in the prisoners' kitchen, and climbed out onto the flat roof of the German kitchen. They then crossed the brightly lit outer yard, and avoided being seen by a guard. They entered a storage cellar under the Kommandantur (Commandant's HQ), crawled out through a narrow air shaft leading to the dry moat, and exited through the park.

This escape was much more professional than Reid's first escape, e.g. they had fake identities as Flemish workmen, to explain their lack of fluency in German and French. They split into pairs, with Reid and Wardle travelling by train to Tuttlingen, near the Swiss border, via Zwickau and Munich. They crossed the border near Ramsen on the evening of 18 October. Stephens and Littledale also travelled to Tuttlingen by train, via Chemnitz, Nuremberg and Stuttgart, then followed Reid and Wardle across the border in the early hours of 20 October.

Reid remained in Switzerland until after the end of the war, serving as an Assistant Military Attaché in Bern from 9 March 1943 until early 1946, and receiving promotion to Temporary Major on 1 November 1945. He was unusually discreet about his duties there, and was in fact working for the Secret Intelligence Service (MI6) gathering intelligence from arriving escapees.

== Postwar ==
Reid left the army on 29 March 1947, but remained a member of the Regular Army Reserve until reaching mandatory retirement age on 15 November 1965. On that day he was awarded the honorary rank of Major.

Reid served in the British embassy at Ankara, Turkey, as First Secretary (Commercial) from 1946 until 1949, then as Chief Administrator for the Organisation for European Economic Cooperation in Paris, France, until 1952.

Reid then returned to his prewar career in civil engineering, serving as a director of the construction companies Richard Costain (Projects) Ltd. and Richard Costain (Middle East) Ltd. between 1959 and 1962, and working for the consulting engineers W.S. Atkins & Partners in 1962–63.

== Personal life ==
Reid married three times. The first was while serving as military attaché; hearing that "Pat Reid married an American heiress in Switzerland!", as one wrote in his diary, amazed prisoners still in Colditz who had not seen a woman in years. Reid married Jane Cabot in 1943. They had three sons and two daughters, and were divorced in 1966.

His second marriage in 1977 to Mary Stewart Cunliffe-Lister ended with her death in 1978.

In 1982 he married his third wife, Nicandra Hood, but they separated after a few years. He died at the Frenchay Hospital, Bristol, on 22 May 1990, at the age of 79.

== Other activities ==
Reid served as president of the Blackboys Cricket Club in Framfield, Sussex in 1972. He actively went on lecture tours in the early 1970s with his models of Colditz Castle and other memorabilia and photographs.

== Awards ==
For his "gallant and distinguished services in the field" during the Battle of France Reid was awarded the Military Cross on 4 May 1943, and was made a Member of the Order of the British Empire (Military Division) on 20 December 1945.

== Publications ==
- The Colditz Story (Hodder & Stoughton, 1952) was Reid's memoir of his time in Colditz, which later became the basis for the 1955 film The Colditz Story, directed by Guy Hamilton, with John Mills playing Reid and with Reid himself serving as a technical advisor. Although focusing mainly upon life inside Colditz and the development of an 'escape academy', the final chapters of the book are devoted to Reid's own escape. The book chronicles everyday prison life, in which characters such as Douglas Bader and Airey Neave appear with no special mention, reporting events in an anecdotal and almost comical style. On 14 October 1942 Reid, along three other British officers, escaped and made their way to neutral Switzerland. What Reid does not mention in his book is that he escaped using Hans Larive's Singen route. Larive, a Dutch naval lieutenant, attempted his first escape from Oflag VI-A in Soest in 1940, but was caught at the Swiss border. The interrogating Gestapo officer was so confident the war would soon be won by Germany that he told Larive the safe way across the border. Larive memorized the information, and many prisoners later escaped using this route.
- The Latter Days (Hodder & Stoughton, 1953), republished as Latter Days at Colditz, also published with the title Men of Colditz: Whilst his first book ended with Reid and Wardle shaking hands under the first Swiss lamp post, the sequel follows the trials and tribulations of the escape committee until the eventual liberation of the castle by U.S. troops on 15 April 1945. It gives even more anecdotal insight into the events following his escape, including the French Tunnel and the Colditz Glider, or the occasion when an entire Dutch contingent unhooked their POW railway car from the rest of the train unbeknownst to the German guards. This last reference to Dutch prisoners cannot be confirmed by any POWs. Reid probably refers to the mass escape of Dutch officers from train transports towards the end of the war when they were transported from Stanislau to Neubrandenburg.
- Escape from Colditz: The Two Classic Escape Stories: The Colditz Story, and Men of Colditz in One Volume (Lippincott, 1953)
- Colditz (Hodder & Stoughton, 1962) : This was an omnibus edition of the first two books, and served as the basis for the BBC Television series Colditz, which ran from October 1972 until April 1974. Reid served as technical advisor to the TV series and would also co-design a board game with Bob Brechin and Brian Degas as an official licensed tie-in to the TV series. The game, Escape from Colditz, was published in the UK by Gibsons Games in 1973.
- From Nile to Indus : Economics and Security in the Middle East, with Sir Olaf Caroe and Sir Thomas Rapp (Conservative Political Centre, 1960)
- Winged Diplomat : the life story of Air Commodore Freddie West, VC, CBE, MC (Chatto & Windus, 1962)
- My Favourite Escape Stories (Lutterworth Press, 1975)
- Prisoner of War : The Inside Story of the POW from the Ancient World to Colditz and After, with Maurice Michael (1983)
- Colditz: The Full Story (1984) : While the first two books can be read as adventure narratives, and have a distinctly 'Battler Briton' ethos of 'sticking one up to the goons' this book takes a more analytic approach, and covers a number of previously suppressed details. For example, Reid describes some of the ways prisoners obtained contraband material, and how British prisoners communicated clandestinely with the authorities in London. He also gives a full account of how prisoners discovered the 'Singen Escape Route'. He also deals with some of the tensions and tragedies of wartime Europe, for example the tensions in the French contingents between Gaullists and supporters of Pétain.
