= Vincent Parker =

Australian RAF officer

- Born: 11 February 1918; Chester-le-Street, England
- Died: 29 January 1946 (aged 27); Felkington Farm, Duddo, England
- Burial place: Harrogate (Stonefall) Cemetery
- Military career
- Allegiance: Australia
- Branch: Royal Air Force
- Service years: 1939–1946
- Rank: Flight Lieutenant
- Nicknames: "Bushy" and "Bush"
- Service number: 42356
- Units: No. 234 Fighter Squadron; No. 56 Operational Training Unit
- Conflicts: Second World War; Battle of Britain; Channel Front (POW)
- Awards: Mentioned in dispatches

Vincent 'Bushy' Parker(11 February 1918 – 29 January 1946) was an Australian Royal Air Force flying ace, a prisoner of war and a serial escaper. He participated in the Second World War.

Parker emigrated to Australia as a child with his adoptive parents. After school, he worked for Kodak and trained as a magician and an escapologist, working with famed magician Leslie George Cole (The Great Lavante).

After travelling to Britain in 1938, he trained as a fighter pilot at an RAF flying school, and subsequently participated in the Battle of Britain. In August 1940, he was taken prisoner after landing in the English Channel.

As a prisoner of war, Parker dedicated himself to escape attempts, including escapes from Stalag Luft I and Stalag Luft III, as a result of which he was imprisoned in Colditz Castle.

Post liberation, in January 1946, Parker was killed in an aviation accident. Townsville City Council named Vincent Bushy Parker park in Rollingstone, Queensland Australia after him.

== Early years ==
Parker was born in Co-operative Street, Chester-le-Street, on 11 February 1918, to Vincent and Lydia Wheatley. He was one of three sons. Parker's mother died aged 26 and his father was unable to cope with his work alongside the responsibility of a young child. In 1920, his aunt Edith and her husband John Parker adopted Vincent Wheatley. Following the adoption, the Parkers changed Vincent's surname and in 1928 the Parkers emigrated to Australia. John found work on the railways and later, Edith found work as the station mistress at a train station in Purono, North Queensland.

Parker attended Bohlevale State School, where reports suggest Parker had an ability for acrobatics and athletics. On leaving school he moved to Townsville, and worked at Kodak on Flinders Street.

At Kodak, a friend recalled Parker somersaulting out of a window. His goal was to catch an invoice caught in the wind. The window had an eight-foot drop and his friend described the action as extraordinary. This stunt impressed a department store manager nearby, who offered Parker a job as a showman. His act at the store was confident, bordering on cocky. and later, a travelling magician caught his act and offered him a role as a travelling magician.

Months of performing over Australia took its toll. Tired, Parker moved to Sydney and in 1938, he obtained a billet as a steward on the cruise liner Ontranto. Parker also met the magician Leslie George Cole (The Great Lavante). Performing and socialising with Cole, he learned to master various methods of escapology.

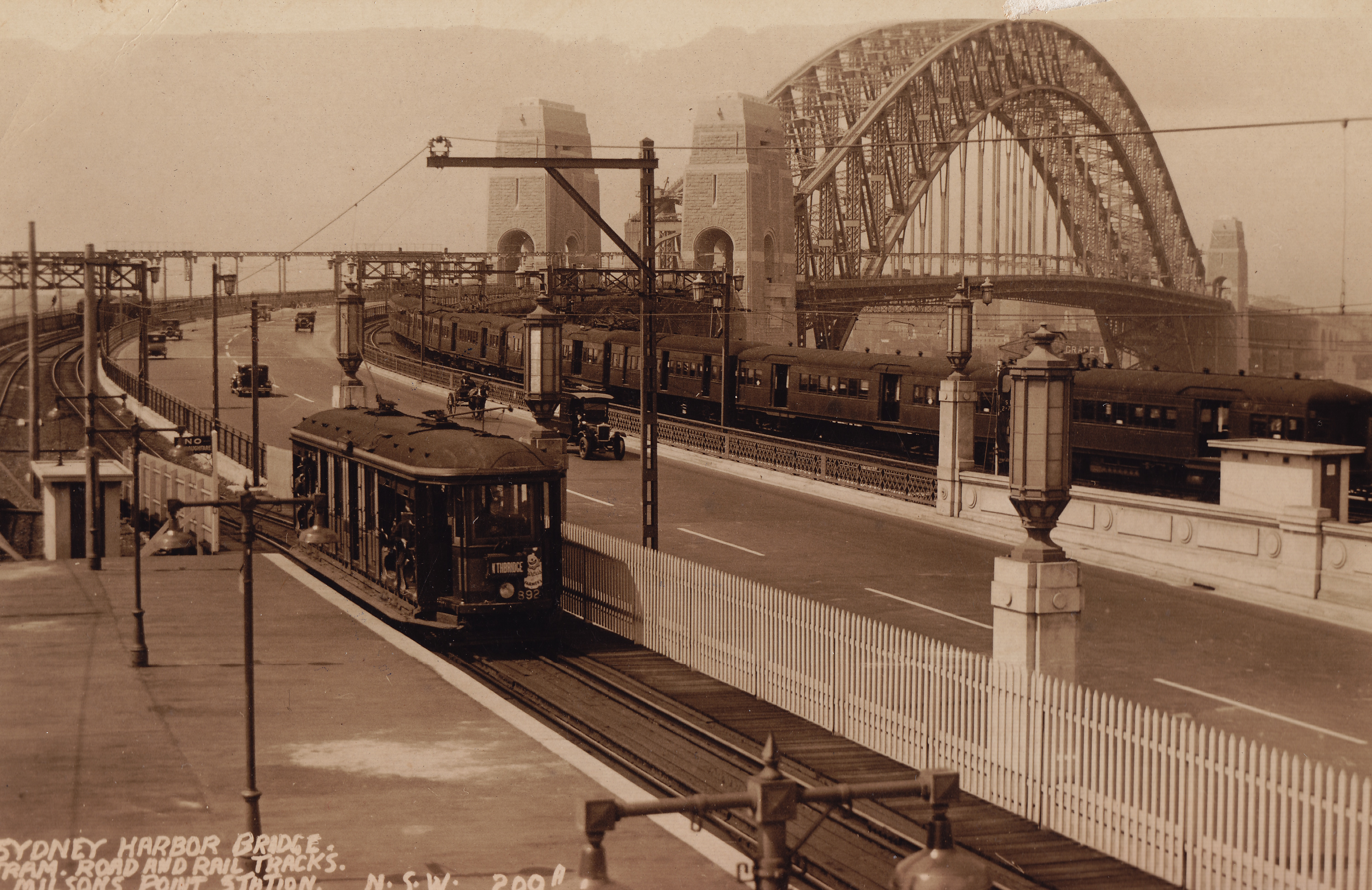
Sydney Harbour Bridge, 1935. Parker moved to Sydney in 1938 and from here, he decided to travel to Britain. In Britain he socialised with his two brothers and joined the RAF.

In 1938, he developed a desire to follow his brothers into the RAF, and cabled his parents in Australia to asked for their permission. On acceptance, he borrowed money from his parents to pay for flying school training.

=== RAF ===
He first trained at a civilian flying school. His training started in May 1939 and was due to take three months. His progression was rapid and he qualified in six weeks. On 22 July 1939, the RAF granted Parker a six-year service commission as a pilot officer on probation. He began his No. 11 Fighter Training School at RAF Shawbury in August 1939 and gained his pilot's badge on 25 October 1939.

On 10 April 1940, the RAF posted Parker to 234 Squadron, RAF Leconfield from 11 FTS.

== Second World War ==
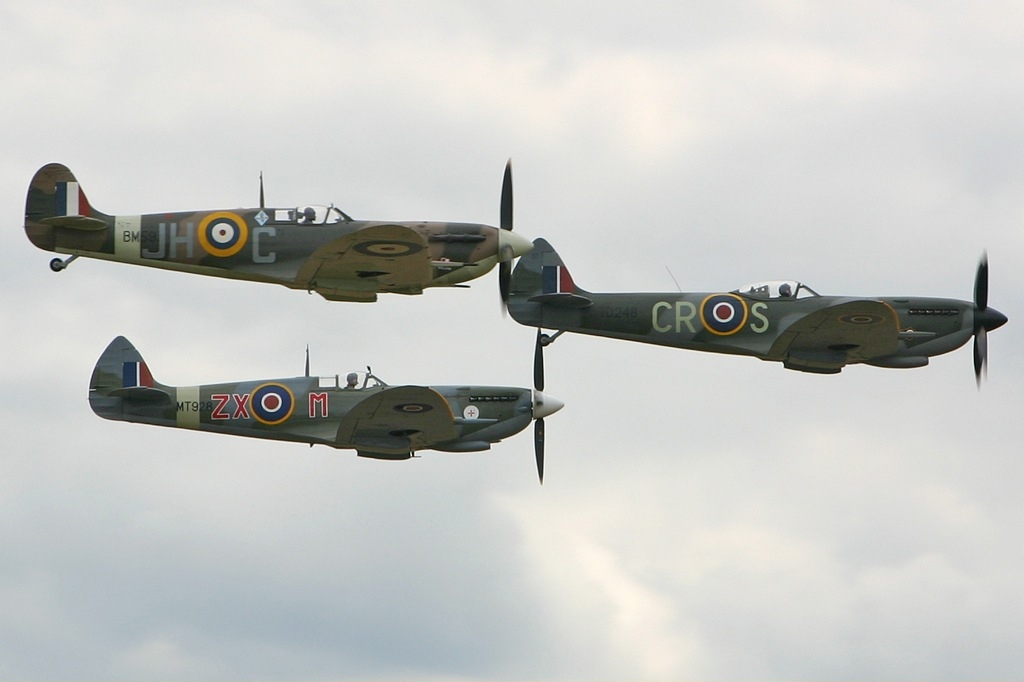
Parker and two comrades flew Spitfires on a practice run. The weather disrupted them.

The RAF regarded the Spitfire as expensive and an important resource. In 1940, the RAF adopted a policy that they would accept no casual reason if a pilot damaged a plane, at the penalty of the pilot being transferred.

Two weeks after joining the squadron Parker damaged his plane. Foggy weather disrupted his given flight path on a practice run. Disoriented, he ran out of fuel. Parker landed in a farmer's field. On landing, he noted a flock of animals lined up. He adjusted his angles of approach and manoeuvered in an appropriate fashion. He decelerated and taxied on the field; his wheels hit a bump, which flipped his plane. Parker left the plane unscathed and the damage to the plane was slight.

Parker explained to his commanders that he took action to save the farmer's sheep. The RAF accepted his reasoning.

On 14 August 1940, the RAF stationed Parker and his squadron at Middle Wallop field. In this period, the RAF promoted him to pilot officer.

=== The Few ===
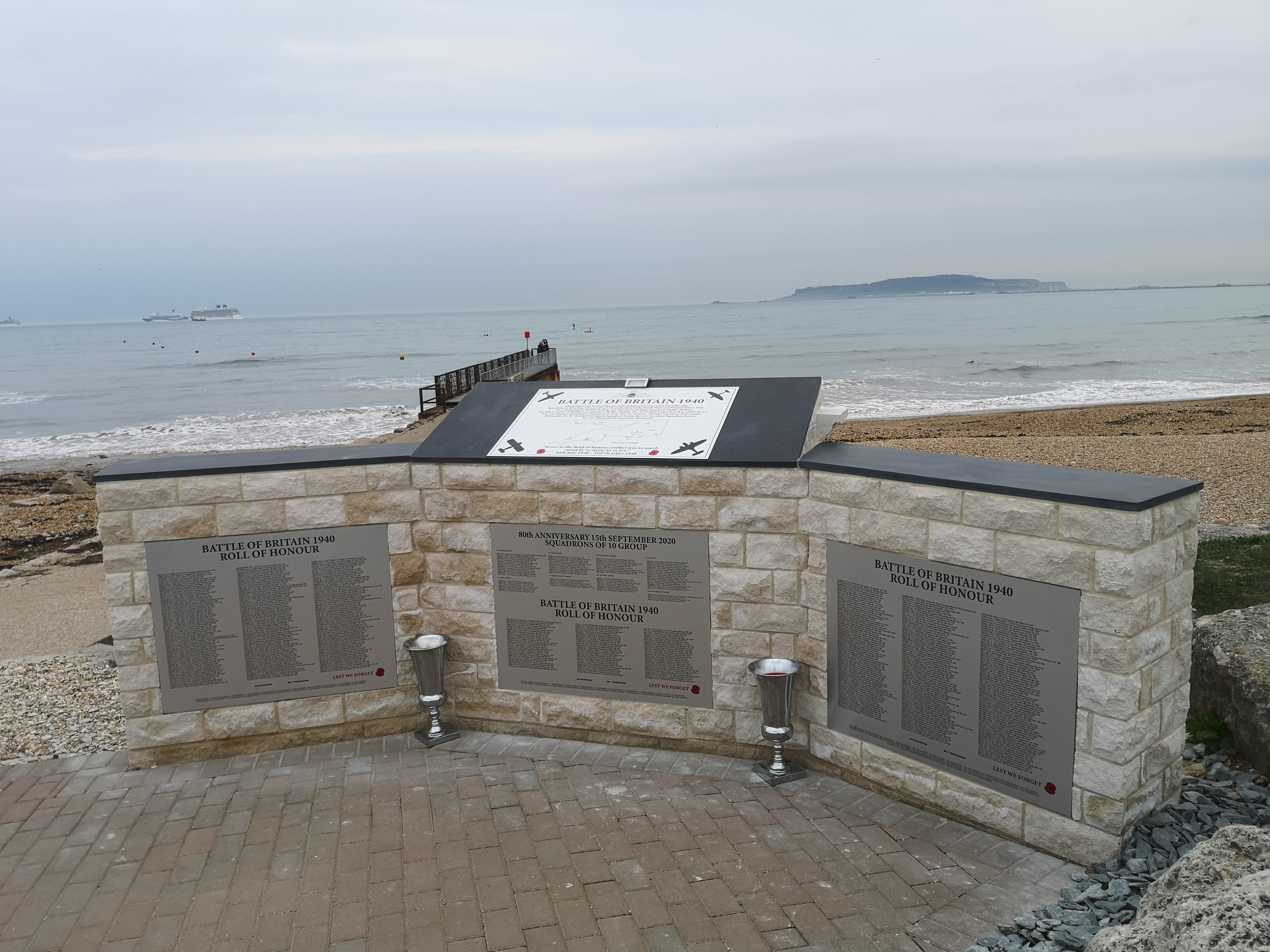
Near to Portland, the Weymouth Battle of Britain Memorial. Parker, Hardy, Hight and Zygmunt were part of The Few.

Parker fought in the Battle of Britain. Part of The Few, listed as a participant, he was a flying ace. Parker repelled at least five bombers in the battle. On 15 August, a dogfight over Portland, occupied Parker and his squadron. The radar marked the air invasion as significant. The raid contained 70 Luftwaffe bombers, escorted by 150 fighters.

Parker shot down two Bf 110 bombers. At 16:15 the Luftwaffe incapacitated his Spitfire. Injuring his shoulder, gliding at 900 feet, he baled out near the Isle of Wight. After four hours at sea a German launch captured him, and transported him to Cherbourg. The Luftwaffe soon flew him to Dulag Luft, the temporary holding center for allied airmen.

Parker was one of four casualties his squadron suffered on this raid. ANZAC comrade, Pilot Officer Cecil Hight lost his life. Pilot Officer Richard Hardy ended up captured in France and joined Parker in Dulag Luft. Sergeant Klein 'Ziggy' Zygmunt, a Pole, survived, having crash landed in Twyford.

=== Character ===
==== Exculpable ====
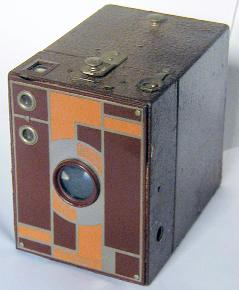
Box camera. The guards found the camera on a spare bunk.

Objects thrown out of windows were common in 1943 in Colditz. Corran Purdon described jeering, cheering, a burning palliasse, water bombs, morale unlike any other camp, and the riot squads, when he entered the Colditz courtyard for the first time.

On 22 June 1943 Eichstätt tunneller Jack Champ arrived at Oflag IV-C (Colditz). Reinhold Eggers and his security staff processed Champ the following day. A protocol required a photograph of Champ with his prison number. In the Schloss, a guard had to chaperone a civilian worker, at all times. Inmates goon baited the protocol. Three water bombs from the third and fourth floors hit the cobbled floor. Splashes soaked Champ, his comrades and the civilian cameraman. This angered the guard and cameraman, who rushed up the staircase, seeking to arrest those responsible on the third and fourth floors.

Following a 1942 order, water bombs and objects dropped out of the window carried the penalty of execution. Parker and Tunstall were exculpated and found innocent of throwing the water. After the water bombs were thrown, they met with ANZAC inmates, and took the brownie camera.

Eggers suspected theft, and ordered a systematic search for the camera, which was found safe, on a spare palliasse.

After this event, Champ introduced himself to Parker. Champ later described Parker as "the most enigmatic of the Australians to set foot in Colditz."

Pat Reid highlighted Parker as a major figure in the POW camp, stating: "Colditz would not have been quite what it was if Bush had not been there, and his activities throw a revealing sidelight upon the life of the prison".

==== Mechanical innovation ====
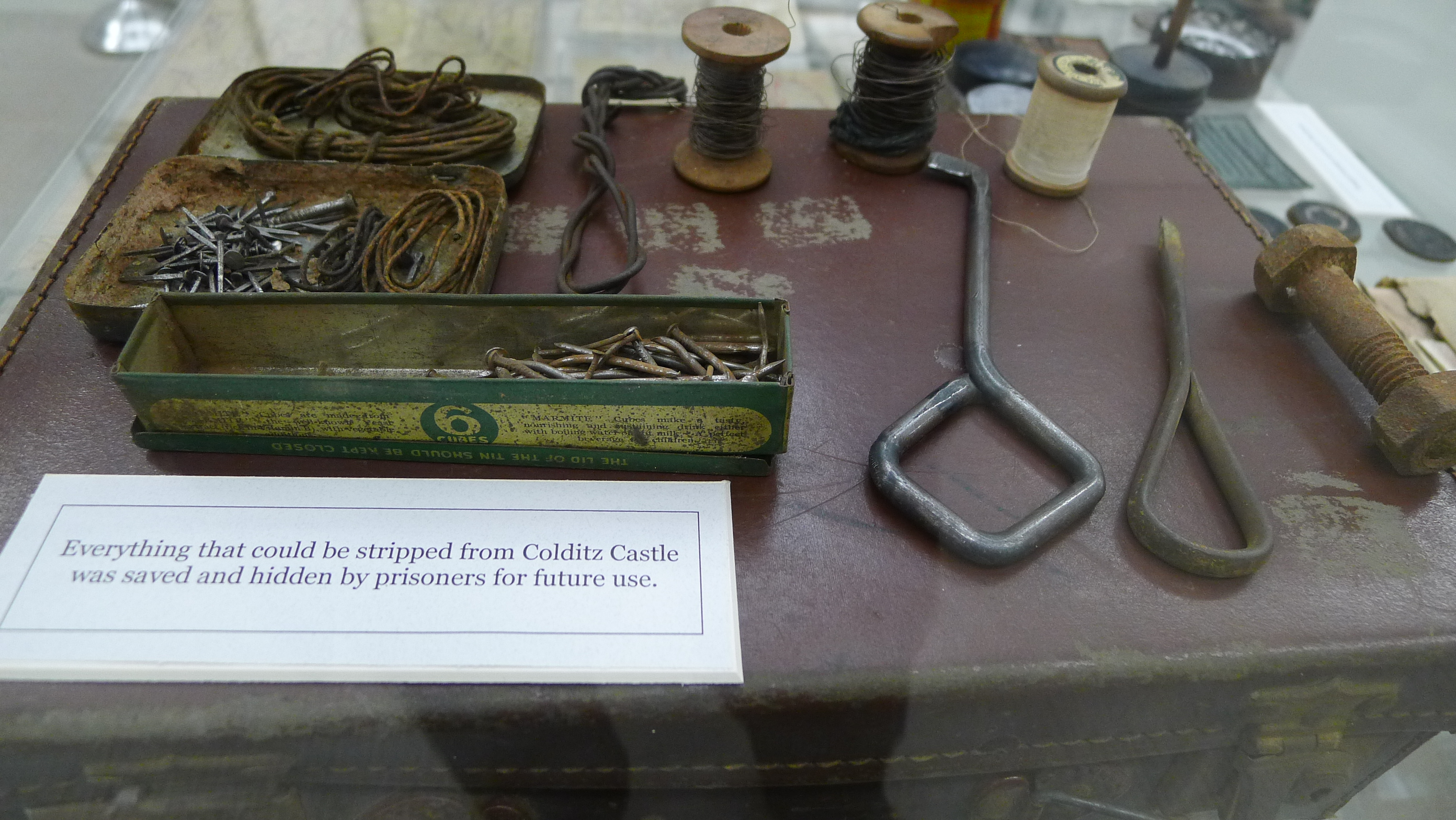
Artifacts at The International Museum of World War II, Massachusetts. A briefcase, a blank key, and tools. Parker filed keys as a POW. Also shown is a wheel stud and a wheel nut.

Parker was ingenious, brave and mechanically skilled. Notably, he was among four outstanding lockbreakers in Colditz, alongside the Frenchman Frédérick Guigues, the Pole Miki Surmanowicz, and the Dutchman van Doorninck. Parker cut keys from discarded fragments of metal, including coal shovels, bed iron and coat hooks. Sapper Jim Rogers stated, "Our lockpick man for this work was 'Bush Parker'... ...In my view, Bush was one of the great men of Colditz". Pete Tunstall, recorded that "he knew for a fact he had illegal tools'.

==== Gestapo searches ====
The Dresden Gestapo turned up at unexpected times to conduct searches and compare photographs to confirm prisoners' identities.

In one instance, Parker stole papers, a weapon and a sandwich from the bag of a visiting Gestapo officer.

Prisoners thought the Dresden Gestapo were incompetent at searches as they were sadistic. The Wehrmacht had experience and competence though. Over time the Wehrmacht guards drilled the searches down to a science.

===== Composure =====
Donaldson recalled Parker's composure. His thinking under pressure was high level. A raid tested this understanding. They knew that day if the ferrets found the tools; they would face it. Parker, picked up the tools, wrapped in a towel. Holding onto the tools, Parker carried the can.

The guards stood them all against the wall. They placed them five feet apart. Parker assessed the environment, contorting enough to screen. Donaldson noted Parker's sleight of hand, saved the tools.

==== Anzac Day ====
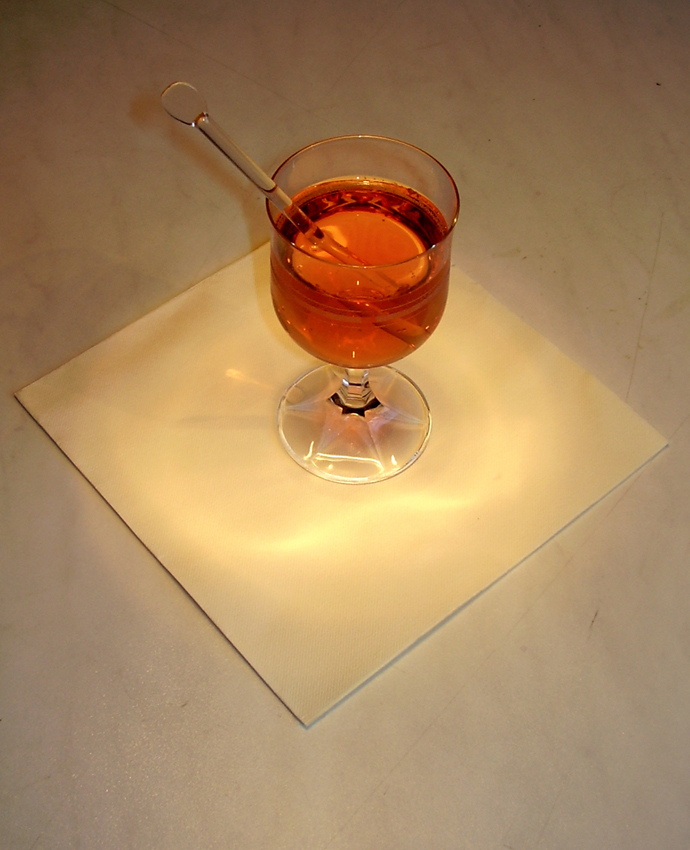
A nice gift from Parker. They had discipline. They were responsible.They drank in moderation that night.

Pat Hughes and Cecil Hight, were ANZACs. Two mates from his squadron. Both gone in 1940.

He paid his respect. In 1944, the mess lads celebrated the Anzacs. They made calculations in March; they went without a meal for two nights per week. This ensured a basic menu for the invited dignitaries for that day. Parker was the central player that night. Rex Harrison was an old mate. Explaining, Parker's batch of grog "tasted of cats piss..., it could burn a hole in steel plates... There would be fewer casualties if water broke it down."

Parker, doing well for himself on the black economy donated his grog for the event.

==== Card sharp ====
He was a card sharp. Few could beat Parker at cards, especially when he shuffled the pack. He had dexterity, and a detailed memory.

===== Royal flush, Bag and Rex =====
Parker, Dickinson, Harrison, Barton and O'Hara, had a weekly poker night. One night, Dick Howe joined in. Here, Howe, eyeballed the card sharping.... Howe explained that after fifteen minutes of play the game warmed up. At this epoch, Parker nudged Howe. Parker had decided to prank Bag and Rex... Dickinson received a good poker hand. A hand that statistically occurs one in four-thousand times... Hence, Parker dealt the fours to Dickinson. Rex Harrison was dealt a hand with a good chance, a hand worth bluffing with. He had a full house. Dick Howe asked for two more cards. In turn, he received a knave, then a ten of hearts. O'Hara and Barton dropped out. The whole mess watched on. The stakes and bluffs grew out of proportion. The pot soon reached two thousand Lagermarken.

The tension grew. Dickinson stressed to Harrison 'he should pack it in... ...and stop the bluffing... as his hand is a power house...'. He ignored Dick Howe. Dick Howe sat by, with a poker face, not making a scene. Howe let Dickinson and Harrison inflate the prize. Under pressure, Harrison dropped out. This prompted Dickinson. With immediate effect, Dickinson settled with Howe to show their hands. Dickinson assumed he had won the jackpot. Dickinson motioned to pick up his winnings. To Dickinson's disbelief though, Howe's hand was a one in six-hundred-thousand chance — a royal flush. The rare Royal Flush caused excitement in the mess quarters. Howe and Parker had internalised laughter. Dickinson and Harrison were devastated — and skint... Howe and Parker were solemn for the two lads. They commiserated them. Later, Howe and Parker handed back the winnings.

This card sharping impressed Howe. He could not figure out this type of shuffling.

===== Bridge game and Bader =====
His comrade Douglas Bader tried to compete. Champ recalled Bader and Guy German taking on Parker and Mike Wittet at a game of bridge. Bader hated struggling. He was tense, he developed an irritation. Perceptive; Champ noted a suspicious wink and a smirk at Wittet from Parker... After that Parker dealt Bader a good Bridge hand. Bader eased and smiled. Champ suspected Parker regulated Bader's emotion. Champ could not fathom out if Parker was taking the piss, or being sympathetic. Both actions had an edge when dealing with the Wing Commander Bader. Bader was not the type to accept light hearted mickey taking. Bader also did not appreciate a sympathetic favour. He suspected if Bader had seen the wink he'd have ignored Parker for life.

=== Messmates and business ===
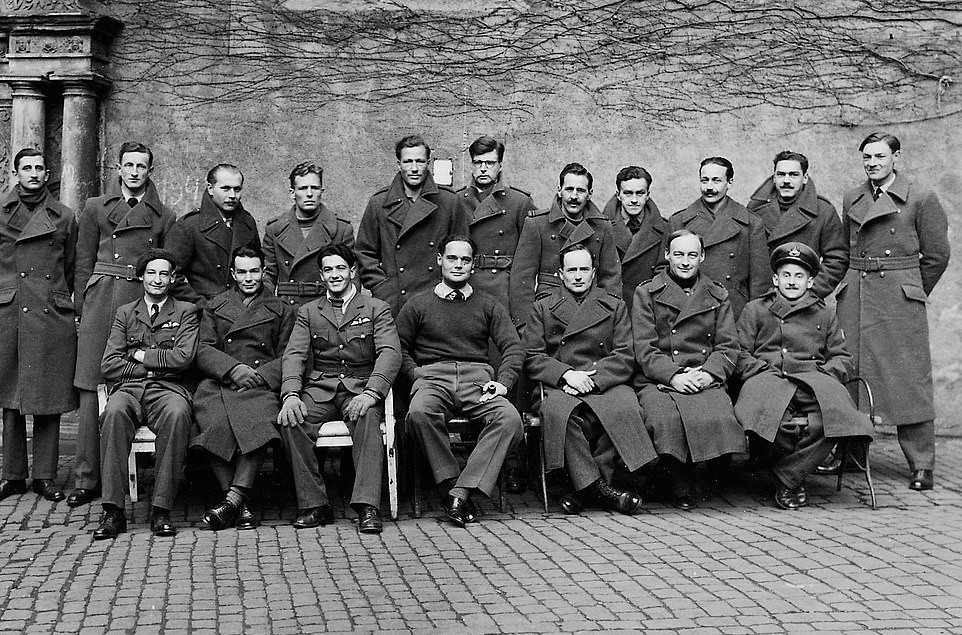
RAF mess at Colditz. F/Lt Albert van Rood (fifth from left, standing), F/Lt Dan Hallifax (six from left, standing), Don 'Weasel' Donaldson (seventh from left, standing), F/Lt John Patrick 'Bag' Dickinson, (first left sitting), F/Lt Vincent 'Bushy' Parker (sitting 3rd from left), Douglas Bader (sitting, center), also shown Dominic Bruce (sitting, furthest right)

Parker was an orator and anecdotalist. He thrived in the company of his mess mates. In Colditz, Parker alongside John Patrick 'Bag' Dickinson and Albert van Rood, dealt in prisoner necessities and Red Cross luxuries. They handled food staples, chocolate, coal and alcohol, which prisoners secretly distilled within the castle.

==== Secret Distillery ====
Parker, along with fellow prisoners Dickinson and van Rood, traded alcohol with a Colditz guard, who handled fuel. The distillery churned a constant stock supply; almost becoming a monopoly. (Note: there were rival breweries and distilleries . There were distillers of note. Distillers such as Michael Farr, George Drew and Pat Ferguson.)

Another inmate, Julius Green, a medically-trained dentist from Glasgow. Protected personnel according to the Geneva Convention. A man with a code of conduct. records that the Colditz Distilling Company also included the Canadian 'Scarlet' O'Hara., and Polish officer Tony Karpf.

External image
- An illicit still from a different camp. Most POW camps distilled and brew alcohol.

The distillery traded and bartered. The company maintained a surplus stock for profit selling a selection of liqueur. Distillers attempted knockoff drinks like grog, whisky, vodka, crème de menthe, white schnapps and gin. A shovel of coal secured a cheap drink.

==== Champ and Bader ====
Parker was a great friend of Jack Champ and Douglas Bader. Jack Champ was one of the Eichstätt lads that arrived in 1943. Both independent characters, Parker and had a mutual respect for each other as pilots.

==== Donaldson ====
Parker and Don 'Weasel' Donaldson (Note: In the literature, his comrades call him Don Weasel Donaldson. His real name is Matthew Wilson Donaldson. He is presented by his initials M. W. Donaldson in other references.) were great friends. Like Pete Tunstall, Don Middleton, Don Thom, Dominic Bruce, Frank Flinn and Walter Morison, Donaldson conceptualised plane escapes.

A Hampden pilot, downed on a daylight raid over Kristiansand Harbour in April 1940, Donaldson was one of three survivors out of 24 from the squadron.

=== Prisoner of war ===
==== Dulag Luft ====
He spent many months in Dulag Luft. He was still at Dulag Luft in May 1941. He was part of the permanent staff in the compound. (Note: Dulag Luft was a transit camp for captured RAF personnel. Parker was at this camp many months. This implies: the guards placed him in a permanent staff role and he later lost the trust of the prison command.) His role was to brief new prisoners on the finer nuances of captivity.

===== Two tunnels =====
In Dulag Luft he dug and planned two tunnels. He dug tunnels with Jimmy Buckley, Peter Butterworth and Great Escaper and X-Organisation founder Roger Bushell. On 1 June 1941, fourteen permanent staff broke the trust of the German command. They formed part of a group of eighteen escapees that tunneled out of the Dulag Luft compound. The command reacted with intent. A search involving three-thousand police and security personnel found each escapee. Parker was one of the permanent staff involved who dug this tunnel. He missed out on the breakout. The guards had shifted him to Stalag Luft I prior and this inconvenience upset Parker.

==== Stalag Luft I ====
===== Loud speaker compass =====
Parker and Buckley reunited in Stalag Luft I. Peter Fanshawe, a future great escaper, joined Buckley and Parker in the next escape attempt. Here they all dug the tunnel. They needed compasses. Parker cadged magnets from the camp loudspeaker. He used these magnets to create compasses. He got caught in the tunnel by the guards... The guards then placed him in the cooler for 14 days.

===== Ghosts =====
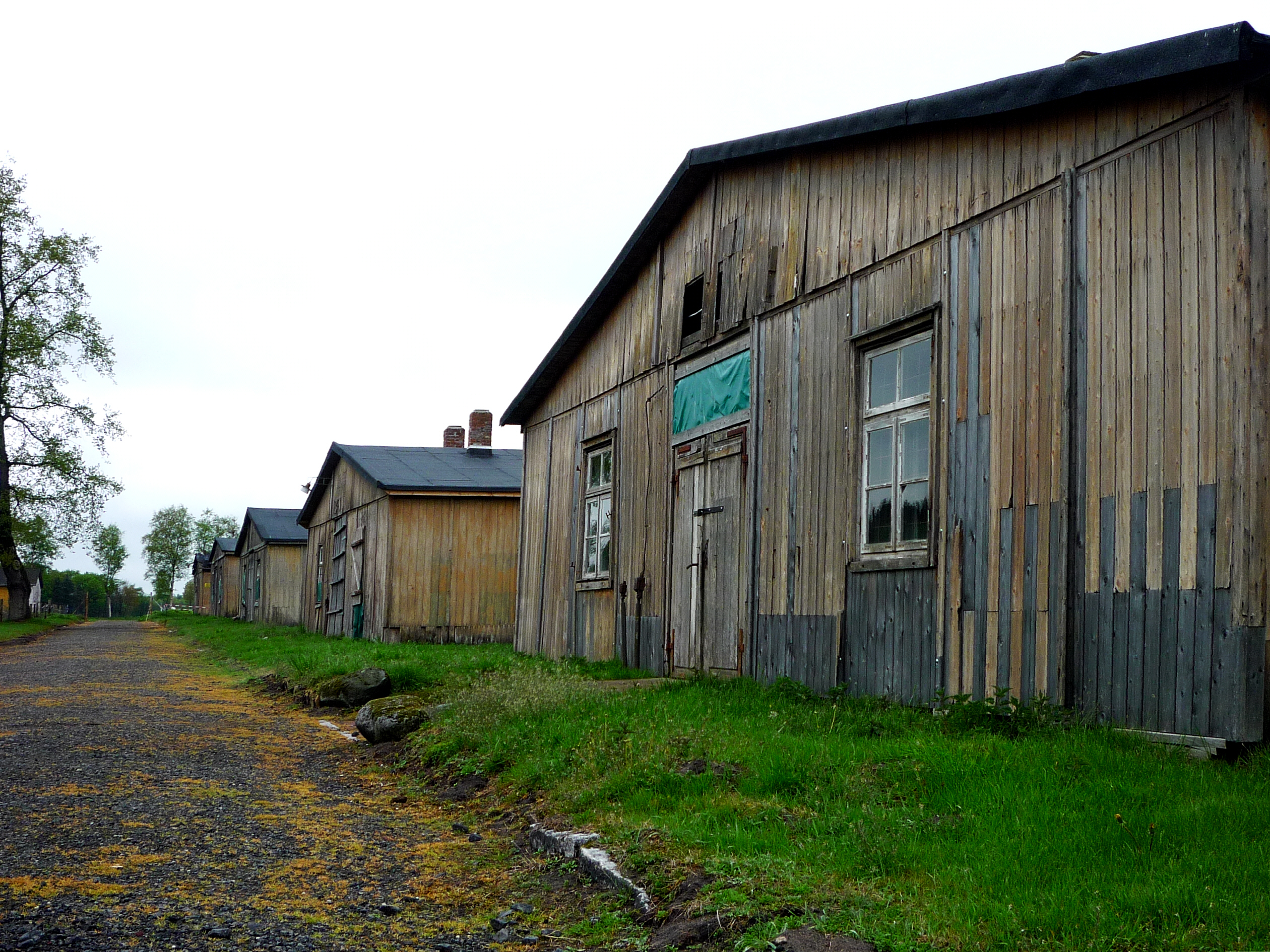
Barracks in a WW2 camp. For six weeks Parker minded his own business. He rested in the roof. He never disturbed the ferrets.

In June 1941, Parker decided the command should presume two inmates had returned home. Parker and Lieutenant Dakeyne became ghosts. They tricked the command to think two men were missing. This had consequence.

Security staff struck two men off the records. At Appells the two missing ghosts would cover for escapees. The theory was ghosts helped escapers flee with less obstruction. They could flee occupied Europe with no search squad hunting them. Minding his own business, Parker hid in the roof. After six weeks ghosting, the ferrets captured Parker... The guards enforced solitary confinement on Parker.

===== Snow burrow escape =====
In January 1942, snow covered Stalag Luft I. Assessing the snow Parker conceptualised another escape. Parker thought about sheep surviving for days whilst flipped inside snow burrows. Thus, Parker believed a snow burrow could hide him until darkness... He theorised if it was dark enough he could climb out of the burrow, cut the wires for a nice escape...

His escape revolved around two rugby matches. On the pitch, players created a burrow... They kicked in snow during a scrum. The next day, on the next match, Parker, via a scrum, placed himself inside the burrow... Next, the players kicked snow over him... They packed Parker inside. To trap heat Parker wore his donated woolens... A white periscope device placed through the snow helped his breathing. He also lay without moving for hours, which lost heat... Finally, when it was dark enough, he crawled out whilst soaking wet... and then sneaked to the wire.

Cutting the wire was dangerous... Guards had recently shot and killed a POW doing it. He cut the wire. He attracted the attention he dreaded... the guards started shouting. They ran to where Parker was working. Much to Parker's astonishment, the guards held back gunfire and arrested Parker near the wire. The guards had assessed a mysterious fire — not an escapee... They thought the condensation steaming off Parker was smoke. This miserable day did not end well for Parker... The command placed Parker in solitary confinement. He spent many days in confinement dealing with frostbite.

In January 1942, the RAF promoted Parker to the rank of Flight Lieutenant.

===== Charlie Piltz =====
A few days after his release from the cells, Parker attempted another escape. Parker had prepared the escape earlier.

Charlie Piltz, real name, Karl Piltz, was the main ferret. Escapers thought of Piltz as the most dangerous guard in Stalag Luft I and Stalag Luft III. He was a passionate anti-Nazi in the 1930s. Over a nine-month period in a prison, the Nazis re-educated Piltz. By 1942 he was a devoted Nazi. He always worked around the clock... He even worked off-duty. He took great pride in sniffing out tunnels. He complimented prisoners on ingenious escape attempts and mocked the poor attempts with glee. Piltz had a nasty criminal mind... as such, he worked on the same wavelengths as an escaper. Piltz was a menace...

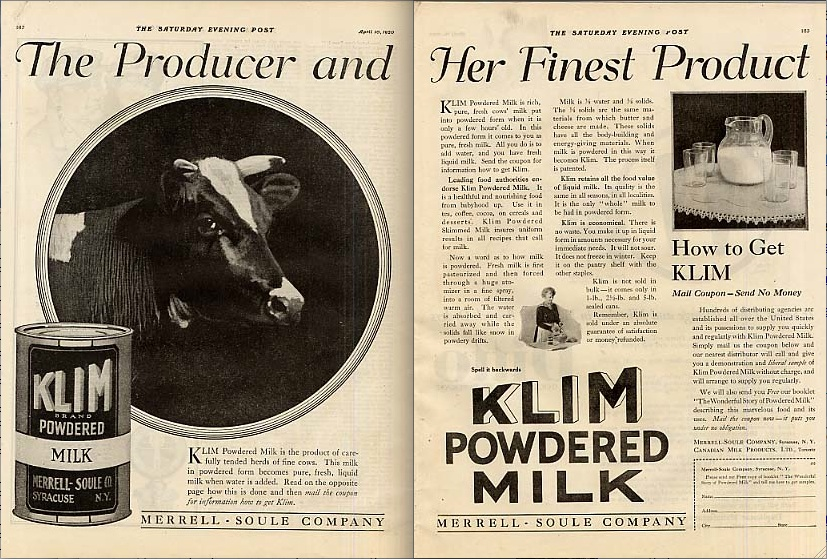
In the Second World War, klim tins had versatility to escapers.

Parker and Piltz shared a visual resemblance. Parker noted the chance to imitate Piltz. Parker acquired a pair of greasy overalls. Piltz carried a torch, following the Piltz shtick, Parker made a dummy torch from Red Cross klim tins. He knew, once he'd beaten the gate as Piltz, he'd become an Italian worker with a matching ID. He'd then use a camp made compass and a traced map to travel.

He executed the gate escape to perfection.... He mimicked the ferret Piltz. He walked through the gates with ease. To the guards he was Piltz on his way home. Outside the gates, Parker headed off to the woods, as planned. Here, Parker was unfortunate... On the way to the woods, Parker walked into his respected adversary — Piltz... Piltz and the guards arrested the brazen Piltz impostor.

==== Stalag Luft III ====
In March 1942 Parker was sent to a new built camp... A camp called Stalag Luft III, situated in Sagan, Poland.

In the new camp, Jimmy Buckley and Roger Bushell continued the 'X Organisation'. Buckley, not Bushell, was the 'Big X' in March 1942. Parker was a founding member of the organisation.

===== Planning staff =====
There were four methods of escape from a compound. You could walk through the gate. You could be transported through the gate. You could climb over or through the wire, or dig a tunnel. In April 1942, the committee requested a role for Planning Staff with experience in the four methods. Parker had experience in many methods of escape. The committee appointed Parker to the role of Planning Officer. Parker's role was an agency for the committee. He had to assess escape plans from prisoners. Assess the prisoners aptitude for escaping, assess if the prisoner was serious enough, and inform them of dangers. Parker would look at the details of the escape plan and hammer it in to shape for the head of the committee. He'd then present the case to the head of the committee for approval.

===== Tunnel attempt and the Vorlager =====
On arrival Parker, and Flight Lieutenants Casey, Panton and Dickinson, dug a tunnel. The busy ferrets found this tunnel. Desperate to escape, Parker was found in the Vorlager (which contained the German administration area) during another attempt. To punish Parker, the command placed him in the cells.

===== Hardware store receipt =====
In April 1942, Australian RAF pilot Cornish possessed a receipt for a magnet from a Sagan hardware shop. Cornish wanted to contain a problematic guard with the document. The flaky guard had once supplied a magnet... Cornish's fake receipt revealed the guard had signed for a package that carried a magnet. Cornish asked Parker to use his magic for the guard... When asked by Cornish, Parker, on cue, revealed the receipt for viewing. Parker threw this receipt in the air... and the receipt vanished. The guard was ashen faced at the sight of that probative document...

In 1942, Parker become one of the first escapers to flee from Stalag Luft III.

===== Train hopping =====
In confinement, during his permitted one hours exercise, Parker, took a key from a door. Parker altered this key... On his next escape attempt, Dickinson in the next cell, distracted the guard. With the guard occupied, Parker opened and shut his cell door with the key. Parker jumped through a window and climbed over the wire. His escape was opportunistic... He hardarsed it. (Note: In the Second World War the term 'hardarsing it' described a POW escaping without key escaping aids.) Parker wore his RAF trousers and a grey sweater, he had no food, and no ID papers.

Outside of the compound, Parker decided to train hop. This mode of transport required luck. A goods train moving out of Sagan train station was the first hop. He travelled to a shunting yard in Chemnitz, Germany. Parker jumped off the train to hide in the woods. With the darkness of night Parker jumped on another goods train and his carriage travelled to Grünberg. Unsettled by this train journey taking him off direction, Parker stole a bicycle and travelled towards Poland.

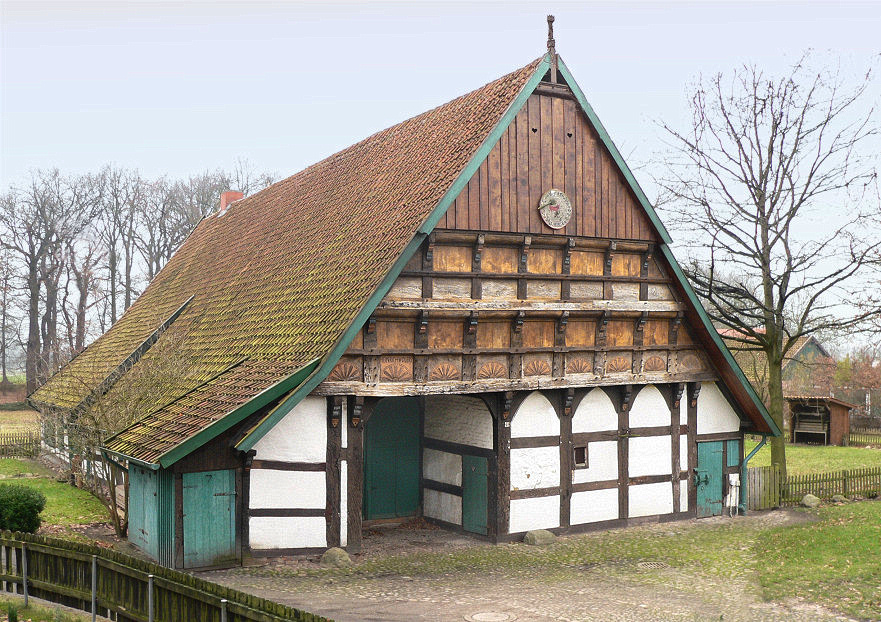
Not a morsel. It was a nice bit of scran... For his tea, Parker ate a loaf of bread. It was taken from a farmhouse...

Food was scarce... Parker satiated his hunger pangs in a farmhouse. He stole black bread, and he ate this meal with no harassment. His bicycle journey took him to another yard near Zullichau on the Polish frontier. Here, he decided on another freight hop. The train had travelled along the Warsaw–Kunowice railway towards Warsaw, Poland... Warsaw was a place he could get help from the resistance. As Parker attempted to jump on this train, the station police accosted him. The capture frustrated an exhausted Parker. Parker's long excursion turned circular. The excursion resulted in a return journey to Stalag Luft III, Sagan. In Sagan, the command returned Parker to the same confinement cell.

===== Scrounging attempt =====
Parker and his neighbour Dickinson were desperate. Doing a longer time in solitary confinement, the two smuggled in saws... The guards captured both sawing the bars...

Getting the guards onside was, in general, common in 1942. Many guards had political sympathies..., ...coffee was liquid gold. Many would take the coffee or the chocolate. This all concerned the X-Organisation. They felt this could lead to problems if too many escapers scrounge. Later, Buckley and Bushell created a department for this type of deft prisoner-guard interaction. Prisoners like Peter Stevens took over this type of work. In April and May 1942, Parker was confident he could bribe a guard. In the cells, Parker and Dickinson attempted to bribe a guard for a tool. The guard found this bribe insulting. The guard took umbrage. The command charged them with bribery.

By May 1942, the command got tired of Parker. They regarded Parker as a serial escaper. On 5 May 1942 the command sent him to high security Oflag IV-C (Colditz).

==== Oflag IV-C ====
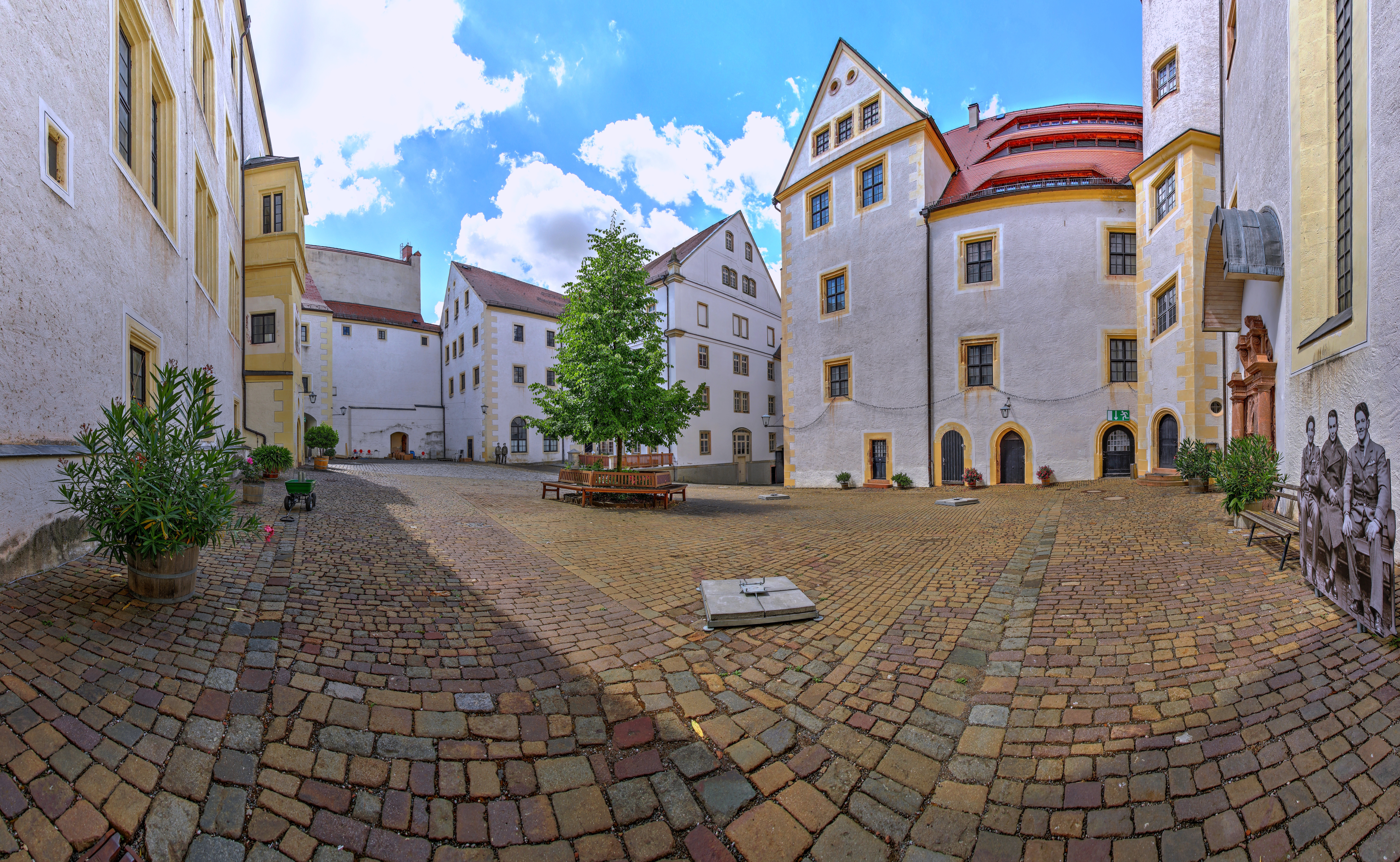
Colditz court yard in 2022. On the right is a museum cutout of Bag Dickinson, Stephenson and Parker.

Parker and Dickinson were immediate in their next effort. They joined Harrison, Dick Howe, Lawton and O'Hara in an exploration. They cut an exploratory hole in the roof. The guards found the hole and arrested each explorer red handed.

===== Locksmith on call =====
On arrival, Parker learned the lags had a problem. Some locks in the castle had up to twenty-seven tumblers. Parker announced he'd sort that out.. Parker cracked on, and in two weeks he had a key for every castle lock. Don ‘Weasel’ Donaldson, recalled the first lock he picked. He and his comrades watched Parker lock picking in the attics... The atmosphere had tension, it was like participating in a heist movie... The only piece of equipment Parker had on arrival was a tube of toothpaste. For this lock, he injected the toothpaste after a tumbler moved. Using the toothpaste, Parker broke into his first door in the castle. Within a week Parker, without using toothpaste, could master any lock inside thirty seconds.

===== Parcel store =====
Parker's comrades developed distraction strategies. They knew that guards could not focus on more than one thing at a time. They exploited the narrow focus of the human mind.

Parker and his comrades knew a big object going missing presented a huge problem for any guard. A guard would face disciplinary action in that scenario. Accusations of loafing on duty would stigmatise him. The command may demote the guard from his rank, or discharge him. They estimated the small chances of any guard reporting such a theft.

====== Ladder ======
November 1942, Tunstall faced a court-martial. Assisted by Bader, and at a height, he splashed Eggers. Black Campbell built the Leipzig case. Barred windows in prison camps breached the Geneva convention. And a case built around a barred window saved Tunstall's life. Looking in to the yard, Tunstall saw an opportunity that eased him. He noted a ladder on the court yard wall. Tunstall thought, the attic could use that. He pondered a ladder festive gift, too. The Dutch lads planned a tunnel, the lads wanted seconds. Tunstall called on Dickinson, Donaldson and Parker.

They placed Donaldson as the decoy. Donaldson slumped on the wall. He kept the guard's attention. For roughly ten minutes he performed. He pulled faces. Made shapes with his hands. Rubbed his nose with his foot. Other lags were perplexed and curious why Donaldson could not see his digits — a bad meal? They besmirched and judged Don Donaldson.

Tunstall and Dickinson took the ladder. They carried it up the spiral staircase. A logistical problem presented itself here; it would not fit. Upset, Parker saved the day. He grabbed his tools and cut off a four-foot section. The ladder, the ether claimed it. (Note: In the literature, Reid does not mention Parker in the theft. He describes Donaldson using the nom de plume 'browned off eagle' to call someone over. Later the browned off eagle used his tools to cut the ladder.In 2014, Tunstall explained Parker used his tools.) No security was called.

====== Civilian vehicles ======
In POW camps, many prisoners had not experienced civvy street for some time. A civilian vehicle was rarely seen inside a POW camp. A vehicle in a camp caused curiosity. In 1942, Parker stole tools from a civilian vehicle parked in the court yard. In this theft O'Hara also stole the map out of the glove compartment. This vehicle theft relied on a team distracting the guards. In 1943, these distractions became comfortable. In 1943 a delivery van appeared in the court yard. The van delivered heavy equipment for the barbers. The lags robbed the van. O'Hara stole a Hydraulic jack. The jack was a good tool, and O'Hara went to the top of the list with the escape committee. He also wanted to steal the back wheel... To their own detriment, the delivery lads rushed and flustered... They had their minds on the next job. Looking out for them, O'Hara left a tightened nut in the back wheel... They later speculated the wheel would fall off the car in a country lane. Parker and his comrades planned and executed the stooging system for the robbery.

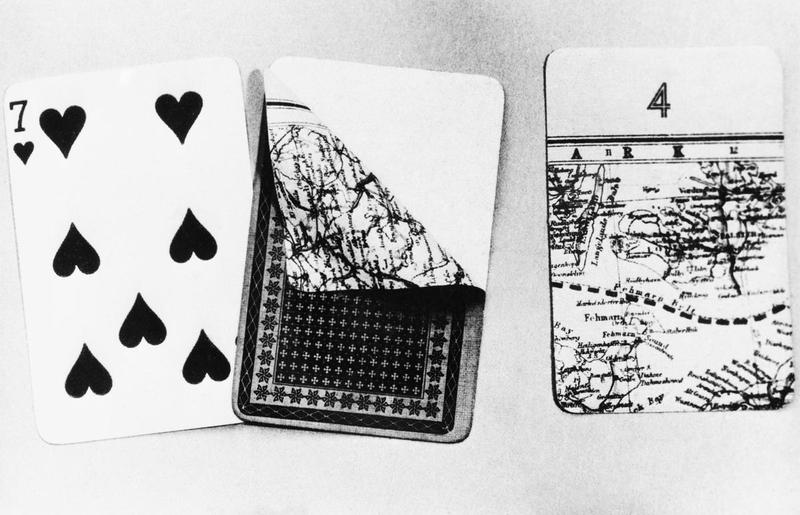
They liked playing cards. They wanted a pack of cards...

====== Locksmith commons ======
Like Parker, the lock-pick Guigues was a serial escaper... In 1943, the guards shifted Fredo Guigues. The Wehrmacht moved the French officers to Lübeck, though a harassed Guigues would later return to the castle... The alarmed parcel store was above the French quarters. Guigues had cracked the store. Before leaving, Guigues had a chat with Dick Howe and Parker...

In 1943 Parker played in the last ever stool ball match. Parker played in the 4–4 draw against the departing French.

====== Cracking the store ======
Parcels were important to escapers. The parcels carried escaping aids. All parcels were checked by the censoring department. And beating the censoring department to the contraband, boosted morale. In the summer of 1943, Parker's mechanical skill gave him access to the uncensored parcels. These heists were tense. The robbery of the store required timing, distractions and strategy... They set up stooging systems involving seventeen lookouts. To keep the guards distracted, the lags arranged chews... These mock punch-ups caused injury. A few POWs ended up with cracked teeth, others ended up in the sick bay with cracked ribs. The lookouts took their positions in the chaos, and Parker, used the lookouts for cues. He opened the doors for Dick Howe, or Doug Crawford. After twenty minutes, he let them out.

===== Sick bay =====
On the 1 May 1943, Schädlich updated his notes. He scribbled, they interrupted Parker, finding him digging at 4 am. Tools lay around the sick bay. Seven sacks of rubble waited for a pickup.

===== Franz Josef escape =====
The Franz Josef escape attempt occurred on 19 May 1943. Mike Sinclair mimicked a guard who resembled Franz Josef. In the effort, the guards shot Sinclair... Parker and John 'Bosun' Chrisp were central to the escape attempt. Chrisp was the ropeman. Parker, was in charge of the sick ward as the signalman. His keys opened up castle doors.

===== A Colditz ghost =====
On 28 March 1944 Parker attempted another escape. This escape was with a ghost called Mike Harvey. To the guards, Harvey and Jack Best had left he castle in March 1943... Harvey wanted people to refer to him as Dennis Bartlett from that day onward. Jack Best was Bob Barnes...

Parker and Harvey cut the barred windows on the third floor of the Saalhous in anticipation for this one... The ropeman prepared the rope, the forgery department prepared the fake IDs and Parker manufactured skeleton keys... Parker also had his lock picking tools ready.

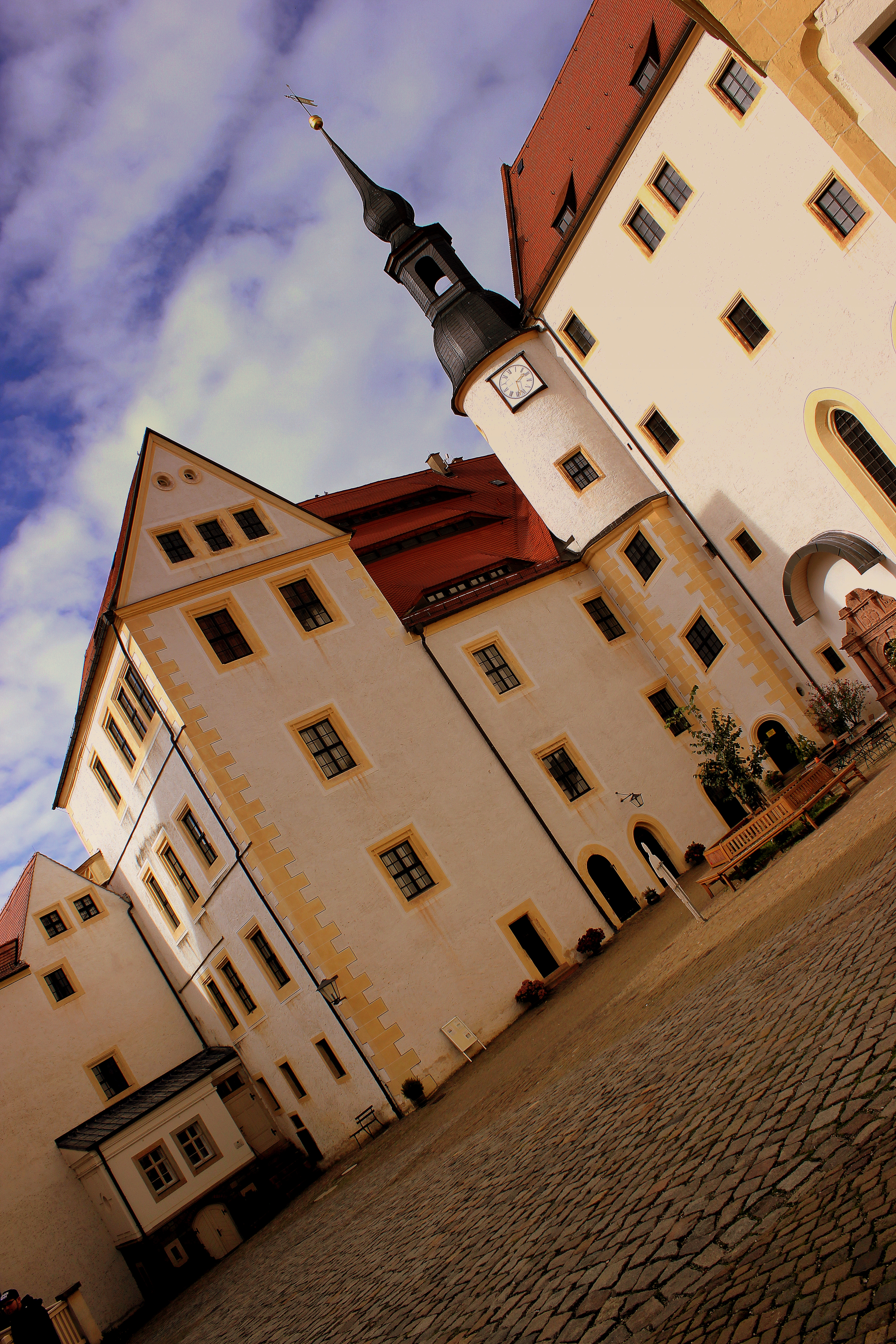
Bottom left is two temporary confinement cells. Greatcoats were an expensive bit of kit... Fresh air was needed in that cell... On the right of the cells, is the parcel office.

Parker had studied the movement of the guards outside the Saalhaus. He noted a building that had the sign Luftschutzraum on it. In General, these shelters had two exits... They believed that more people entered that building than exited it. They opined one exit led to a civilian area. Parker and Harvey also did recce on the patrolling guards... They noted a guard disappeared when he marched around the corner. The guard always left a 20-second window of opportunity...

On the day of the escape attempt, Parker and Harvey, out of sight of the guard, rappelled from the third floor window and made their journey... On their way to the shelter, a sentry heard them... They startled this guard... Reactive, he fired warning shots... Making it worse, he smashed the alarm... Hassled, Parker picked the lock of the shelter door... Inside the shelter, Parker locked the door. Outside of the shelter it swarmed with guards using torches, using flood lights and carrying weapons. The security team rattled the locked door, and left. Parker and Harvey rushed down to the cellar that led to a dead end... Here they realised this escape was over.

Eggers interviewed both escapers. Parker turned the conversation, 'he was surveying, not escaping'. It was for Eggers's benefit... The one exit shelter dismayed Parker... He could not forgive that regulation breach. Parker contended, Eggers knew what he had done here... The poor bastards... He told Eggers he'll make a safety complaint... Eggers matched Parker's face and sent Parker to a temporary cell in the courtyard. Eggers smelled a rat with Harvey. His face did not fit the ID photo of Dennis Bartlett... This resulted in suspicion. Eggers also found Jack Best... and this ended the ghosting in Colditz. Uncovering the ghosting scheme stressed the security team... Excited, they did not search Parker. They left him with his skeleton keys... Parker cut a hole in the wire grill and passed out his greatcoat which contained his prized tools. The guards gave Parker extra confinement for damaging the cell grill.

===== Great Escape =====
The Gestapo executed comrades of Parker, after the Great Escape. These murders, included the murder of Bushell — a comrade Parker had dug tunnells with. Parker involvement in escaping activity was heavy at Stalag Luft III before he was shifted. Parker reflected on 'what could have been'...

===== Private Murphy liberation =====
On 15 April 1945, Private Murphy of the US Army liberated the castle. On the 16 April, three French POWs had ignored instructions and went missing. They had ventured into the countryside. The countryside around Colditz was volatile. On the 17 April, Dick Howe, as a senior officer, assessed the POW contingent around town. He made observations around Colditz. He noted Parker and his messmates had split up. Howe spotted Don Donaldson in a villa. Donaldson had a pleasant day. The owners of the building had done well for themselves during the war years. Donaldson, and two others were drinking cups of tea with three blondes. Howe spotted a large Mercedes-Benz touring car. Out of place..., it was driving around the town. Howe noted, Vincent Parker was in the driving seat, and Parker's two business partners, Dickinson and van Rood were his passengers. Following the liberation, Parker returned to England for a period of leave. The RAF then posted him to Milfield to qualify on Hawker Tempests.

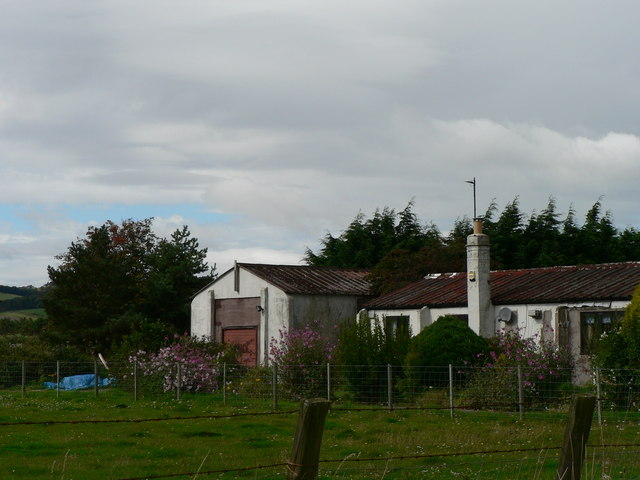
Old RAF Building at RAF Milfield. Vets had brews on the ground floors...

== Personal life ==
Post war, Parker planned to marry his girlfriend.

== Death ==
On 29 January 1946, Parker tested a plane. Following a slow roll from 5000 ft, his plane, the Tempest V EJ859, crashed. He died near Felkington, Duddo, Northumberland.

== Legacy ==
The RAF buried Parker at 10 am, on 2 February 1946. Parker rests in Harrogate (Stonefall) Cemetery. Colditz comrade Noel Dan Hallifax rests nearby.

Mentioned in dispatches during the Second World War, the Air Ministry gazetted him on 13 June 1946. The city council in Townsville, Australia named 'Vincent Bushy Parker Park', situated in Rollingstone after him. In 2003, the City of Thuringowa Council commissioned three murals to place inside his park. The murals paid homage to Parker's life and the amenities block at his park houses them. In 2007, the historian Colin Burgess published a book about Parker.

On Sunday 21 April 2024, almost 80 years to the day after Parker and his mates celebrated ANZAC day with the grog, Stonefall Cemetery CWGC paid respect to the ANZAC Vincent Parker. On Armed Forces Day, 29 June 2024, Vincent Parker's story was one of the five RAF volunteer stories remembered at Stonefall Cemetery CWGC.

== See also ==
- Douglas Bader a serial escaper and flying ace.
- Dominic Bruce a seventeen times serial escaper.
- Jimmy Buckley a notable comrade of Parker.
- Roger Bushell Great Escaper and X-Organisation founder.
- John Chrisp The ropeman of Colditz. Integral to many escape attempts.
- Lieutenant Alan 'Black' Campbell A lawyer whose skills saved lives.
- Leslie George Cole (The Great Lavante) a magician who mentored Parker.
- Damiaen Joan van Doorninck a Dutch Colditz escaper, and a lock breaker.
- Reinhold Eggers The security officer of Colditz from November 1940 to April 1945.
- Julius Green, an associate to the mess. He fixed lags teeth.
- Cecil Hight A comrade of Parker's who died on the day Parker was captured.
- Dick Howe a serial escaper and the head of the escape committee.
- Pat Hughes ANZAC comrade of Parker, from 234 Squadron.
- Corran Purdon a St Nazaire Raid commando and a Colditz comrade of Parker.
- Pat Reid an author, and a comrade of Parker.
- Geoffrey D. Stephenson a Colditz comrade of Parker's.
- Peter Stevens serial escaper and scrounger in Stalag Luft III
- Pete Tunstall a serial escaper and notable goon baiter.

== Sources ==
Books

- Burgess, Colin (2007). Bush Parker: An Australian Battle of Britain Pilot in Colditz. Australia: Australian Military History Publications. ISBN 978-0980320473.
- Burgess, Colin (2019). The Diggers of Colditz (3 ed.). Australia: Simon & Schuster. ISBN 9781760852153.
- Eggers, Reinhold (1961). Colditz - The German Side of the Story (edited and translated by Howard Gee). New York: W. W. Norton & Company.
- Green, James (2022). The Colditz Conjurer: The amazing true story of Vincent 'Bush' Parker, Battle of Britain pilot and prisoner of war magician. UK: Seven Questions Publishing. ISBN 978-1739705602.
- Green, Julius Morris (25 November 1971). From Colditz in Code. United Kingdom: Robert Hale. ISBN 978-0709124825.
- Grehan, Howard (2016). Stalag Luft III: An Official History of the 'Great Escape' PoW Camp. Pen & Sword Books. ISBN 978-1-47388-305-5.
- Hall, Roger (2013). Spitfire Pilot An Extraordinary True Story of Combat in the Battle of Britain. Amberley Publishing. ISBN 9781445616841.
- Laplander, Robert J. (2014). The True Story of the Wooden Horse. England: Pen & Sword Military. ISBN 9781783831012.
- Macintyre, Ben (15 September 2022). Colditz: Prisoners of the Castle. United Kingdom: Penguin. ISBN 978-0241986974.
- Reid, P. R. (2015). Colditz: The Full Story. New York: Voyageur Press. ISBN 9780760346518.
- Reid, P. R. (2014). The Latter Days at Colditz. UK: Hodder & Stoughton. ISBN 9781473603653.
- Rogers, Jim (1986). Tunnelling Into Colditz. UK: R. Hale. ISBN 9780709028048.
- Schädlich, Thomas (2016). Tales from Colditz Castle: Diary from Martin Schädlich. Colditz, Germany: Verlag Schädlich. Kindle Edition. ASIN B01M0YQGZM.
- Tunstall, Peter (2014). The Last Escaper. London, UK: Duckworth. ISBN 978-0-71564-923-7.
- Walters, Guy (2013). The Real Great Escape. UK: Bantam Press. ISBN 9780593071908.

Gazettes, journals, newspapers and magazines

- Air Ministry (13 June 1946). "Supplement: 37598" (PDF). The London Gazette (Supplement). London.
- Chalmers, Graham (2 September 2022). "Why Harrogate is shining a light on WW2 heroes". harrograteadvertiser.co.uk. UK.
- Fraser, Ian (18 January 2015). "Spitfire pilot dies aged 27". Townsville Bulletin.
- Staff (31 January 1946), "EX-P.O.W. CRASHES", Berwick Advertiser, Berwick, archived from the original on 22 January 2023
- Spencer, Kate (9 April 2024). "ANZAC Day ceremony to honour Second World War casualties at Stonefall Cemetery". Harrogate Informer. Harrogate: harrogate-news.co.uk.

Websites

- ACR (12 March 2021). "15.08.1940 No. 234 Squadron Spitfire I R6985 P/O. Vincent Parker". aircrewremembered.com.
- BBM (1 January 2007). "The Airmen's Stories - P/O V Parker". bbm.org.uk.
- CBC Museum (23 June 2004). "CANADA'S AIR WAR 1940" (PDF). bombercommandmuseumarchives.ca.
- Chester-le-Street Heritage Group (1 January 2022). "Vincent "Bush" Parker". chesterlestreetheritage.org. Archived from the original on 14 January 2022.
- Collins, Kenneth (24 February 2023). "Prisoners of the Castle': The Jewish prisoners of the Nazis at Colditz - review". jpost.com.
- CWGC (29 January 1946). "Flight Lieutenant Vincent Parker". cwgc.org.
- CWGC (b) (8 November 1946). "Squadron Leader Noel Dan Hallifax". cwgc.org.
- Moss, Alex (29 June 2024). "Stories of war dead shared from beyond the grave". bbc.co.uk. bbc.
- Staff Reporter (22 November 2005). "George Drew, serial escaper, dies at 87". Mail & Guardian.
- Townsville City Council (24 January 2014). "Vincent 'Bushy' Parker Park" (PDF). townsville.qld.gov.au.
