= Bournemouth East Cemetery =

Historic cemetery in Dorset, England

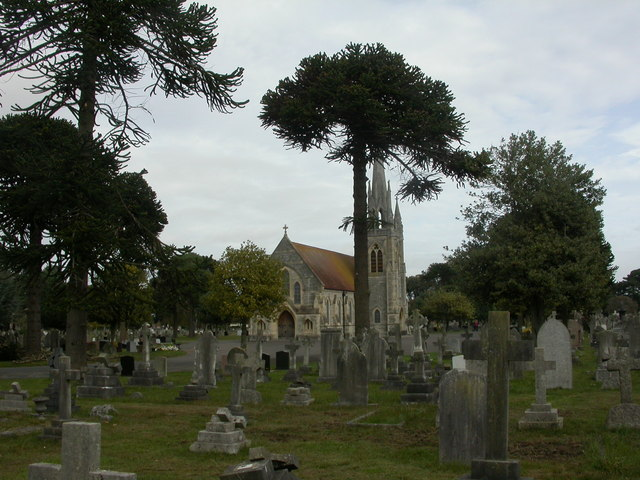
- Bournemouth East Cemetery
- Interactive map of Bournemouth East Cemetery

Details
- Established: 1897
- Location: Gloucester Road Bournemouth
- Country: England
- Coordinates: 50.733°N 1.830°W
- Type: Cemetery
- Owned by: Bournemouth, Christchurch and Poole Council
- Find a Grave: Bournemouth East Cemetery

Bournemouth East Cemetery (formerly known as Boscombe Cemetery) is a municipal cemetery in Boscombe, Bournemouth, England. In 1982, the chapels (built 1897) were grade II listed with Historic England.

In the cemetery is a section maintained by the Commonwealth War Graves Commission holding burials from World War I and World War II, which contains 75 of the 120 World War I graves, by the main path and includes a Special Memorial to two soldiers drowned off Bournemouth in 1915, whose bodies were not recovered. The plot also contains seven of the 68 World War II burials, the rest being scattered throughout the cemetery. One of the World War I burials is unidentified. There are four Foreign National war burials here.

== Burials ==
- Cecil Hight (1917–1940 †), New Zealand RAF officer
- Arthur Mayo (1840-1920), Royal Navy Indian Mutiny recipient of the Victoria Cross.
- William Punch (1880–1917 †), Wiradjuri serviceman in the First Australian Imperial Force
