= Leslie George Cole =

Australian illusionist

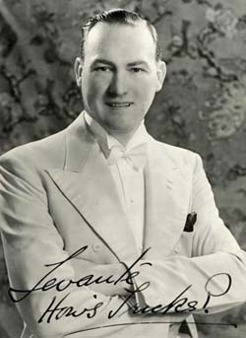
- Born: Leslie George Vante Cole; 5 March 1892; Alexandria, Sydney, Australia
- Died: 20 January 1978 (aged 85); Bellevue Hill, Sydney, New South Wales, Australia
- Other names: Les; Levant; Levante; Magician Cole; Les Cole
- Occupation(s): Illusionist; Magician; Stunt performer actor
- Years active: 1907–1977
- Organization: Australian Society of Magicians Incorporated
- Notable work: How's Tricks
- Spouse: Gladys Pretoria Costin (m. 7 June 1919 – 20 January 1978, Cole's death)
- Children: Esme Levante
- Parent(s): George Cole; Sarah Catherine

Leslie George "Les" Vante Cole, known professionally by the stage names "Levant", "Levante", "The Great Levante" (Note: "Levante" should be pronounced as "Levant"; the final "e" is silent.) and Magician Cole (5 March 1892 – 20 January 1978), was an Australian illusionist. He is regarded as one of the greatest magicians in the world and "Australia's most famous magician". He is also credited with creating the Impaling illusion.

== Early life ==
Leslie George Vante Cole was born 5 March 1892 in Alexandria, Sydney, Australia to Sydney-born couple George Cole, a driver and Sarah Catherine (née Chapman, later Reid.), a homemaker. His family later moved to Wangaratta, Victoria where the elder George Cole bred and sold pig's trotters and operated a dairy farm. Cole was educated within Wangaratta, having been raised there, and his first job was driving a baker's cart.

== Career ==
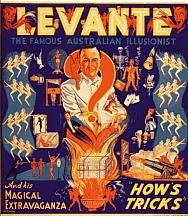
Publicity poster for "How's Tricks"

Cole was already involved in magic in as early as 1907, when he founded what is now the fourth oldest magical society in the world, the Australian Society of Magicians Incorporated. In 1909, Cole, then aged 17, travelled to Melbourne and found work at the Vine Hotel in Richmond. There, he marked billiards and tended the hotel's bar. It was at the hotel where he encountered showman Tom Selwyn and became his apprentice. Cole spent two years studying under Selwyn, who gave him the stage name "Levant" (later changed to "Levante") and subsequently the "Great Levante", occasionally performing at repertory theatres before going solo as a professional magician, making appearances at Luna Park, White City and Queensland. Once for publicity, a fully shackled Cole jumped from the Princess Bridge into the Yarra River, a greater feat than fellow magician Harry Houdini who had performed a similar stunt off the Queens Bridge in 1910. During World War I, Cole briefly acted in military propaganda films and helped recruit soldiers. After the war Cole worked under the handles Les Cole and Magician Cole. In 1920, at Cole's proposal, an Australian Society of Magicians branch was set up in Melbourne. Six years after the birth of his daughter Esme in 1927, the Cole family, a trio composing of Cole, his wife Gladys Costin and Esme (acting as assistants for Cole), toured the globe. During which they travelled out of Australia to the Philippines, Malaya (now split into Malaysia and Singapore), Borneo, India, Russia, China, Japan and England. The world tour, which was Cole's first, lasted till 1940. While in England, he came up with the idea for a magic show which would have comedic elements, singers and animals. It was to be known as How's Tricks and it had a cast of forty. In 1939, the International Brotherhood of Magicians elected him as the world's number one magician. He returned to Australia in November 1940, entertaining army troops in Queensland and settling in New South Wales. A financial member of the Variety Artists' Federation of Great Britain, he continued to actively tour and in 1954, he visited South America. Cole officially retired in 1977. In recognition of his contributions to magic, the Academy of Magical Arts awarded him the Performing Fellowship and the Masters Fellowship.

== Personal life ==
On 7 June 1919, Cole married Gladys Pretoria Costin, a clerk, whom he first met on 11 November 1918. They wed with Methodist rites at her father Kelvin Grove's home. They had one daughter, Esme (1921–1989), who at 5, was already performing with Cole. On 15 November 1941, Esme Cole married another member of Cole's magic show, Robert Butt, on stage. Cole enjoyed trout-fishing, playing chess and exposing spiritualists as frauds. He was also an avid reader and artwork collector. Over his lifetime, he collected as many as sixty paintings and engravings, most of which were by Norman Lindsay.

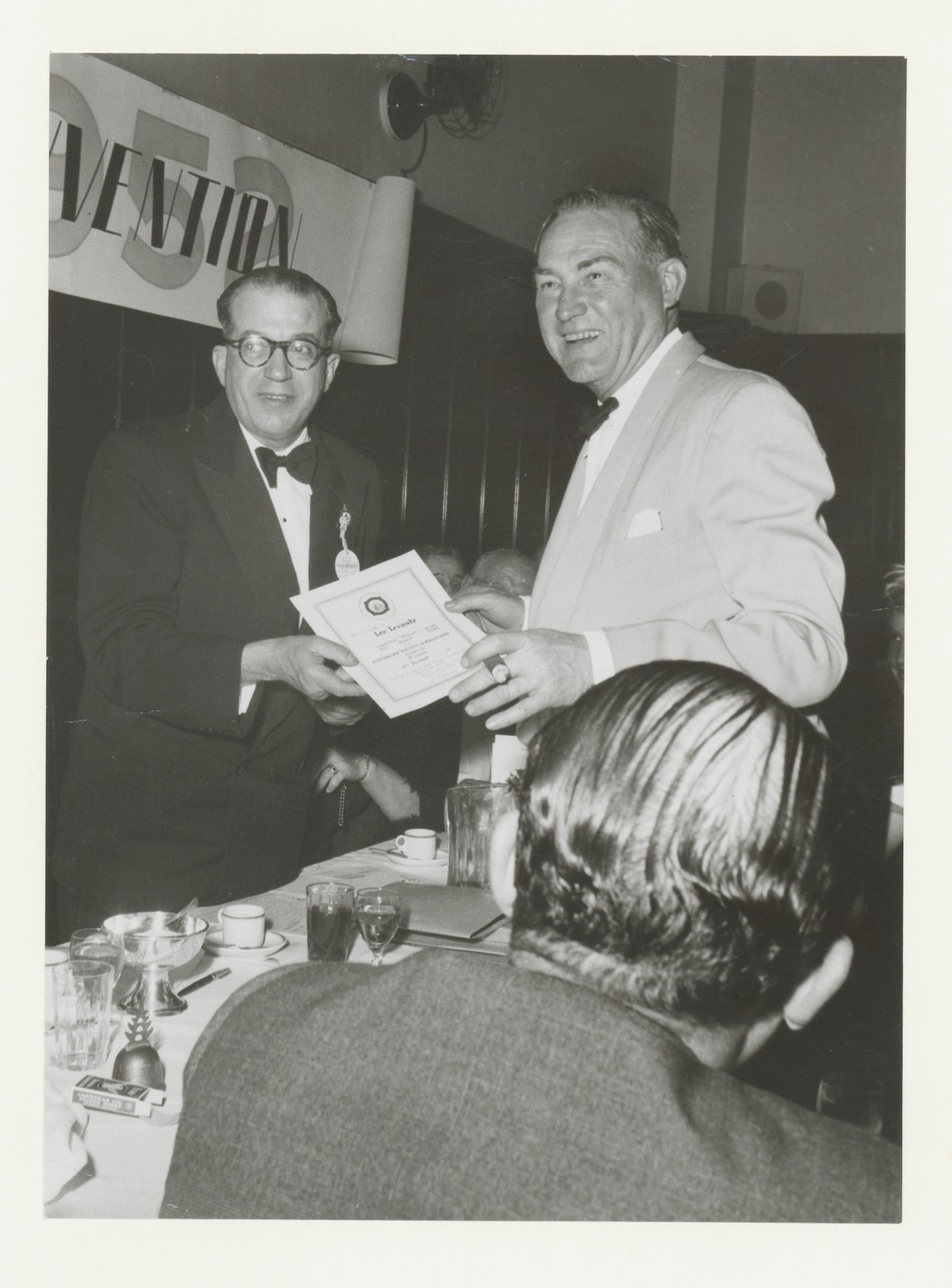
Levante receiving Life Member Certificate, Australian Society of Magicians, 1952

== Later years and death ==
In his later years, Cole frequently toured around Australia, occasionally travelling to England. Cole died on 20 January 1978 at his eleven-room house located in Bellevue Hill, Sydney, New South Wales, Australia, which he purchased post-World War II. He spent his final years with his wife, daughter, son-in-law and grandson. He was cremated following his death.
