= Harrogate (Stonefall) Cemetery =

Cemetery in Harrogate, North Yorkshire, England

Harrogate (Stonefall)
- Commonwealth War Graves Commission
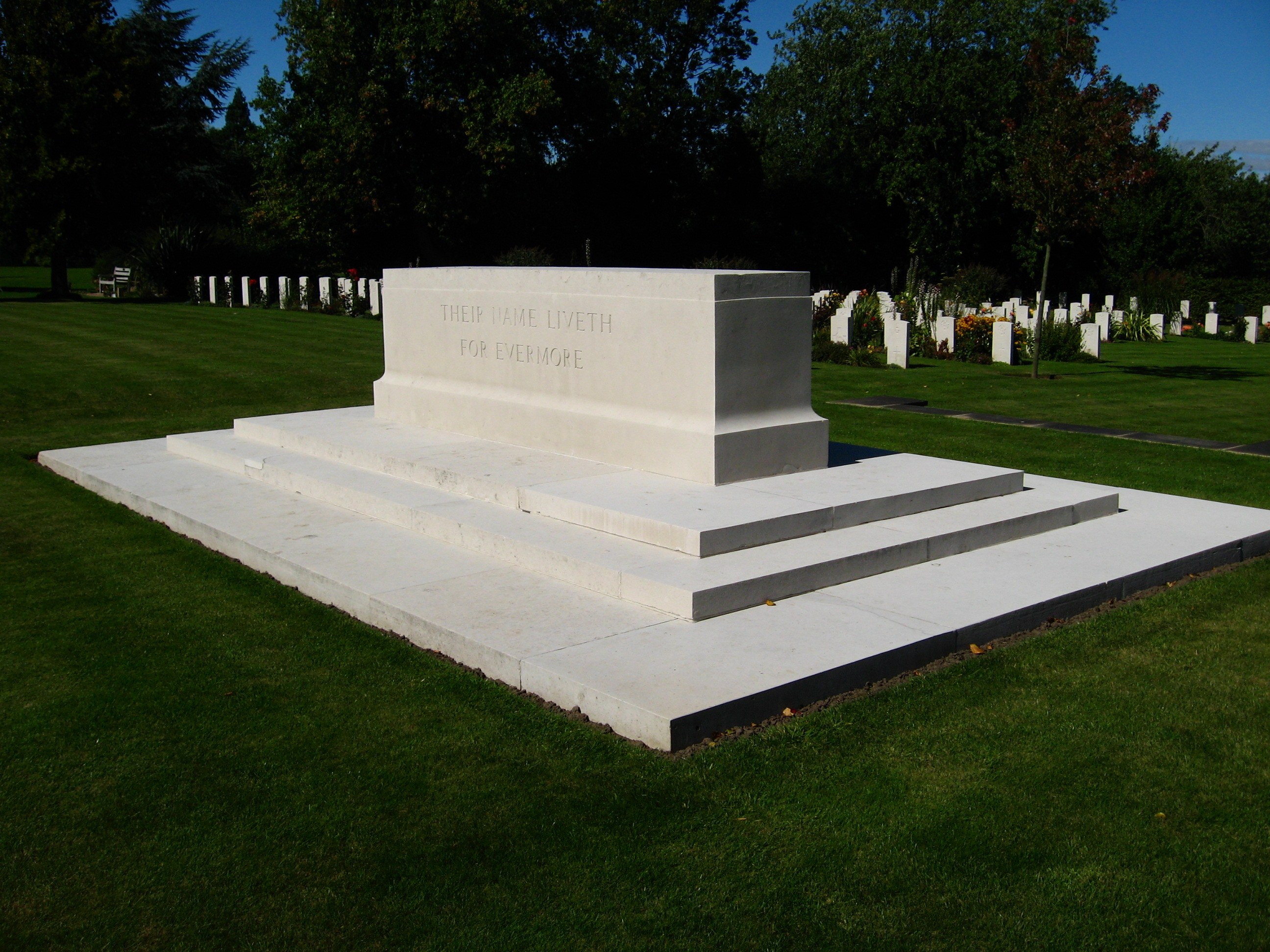
- Harrogate (Stonefall) Commonwealth War Graves Commission cemetery entrance stone
- Used for those deceased 1943–1947
- Location: 53.9862°N 1.4950°W near Harrogate, North Yorkshire, England
- Total burials: 1,017 (including special memorials)
- Unknowns: 1

Burials by war
- World War I: 23 World War II: 988

Harrogate (Stonefall) Cemetery is a Commonwealth War Graves Commission (CWGC) burial ground for the dead of the First World War and Second World War located on the outskirts of Harrogate in North Yorkshire, England.

The cemetery grounds are located next to the main municipal cemetery and crematorium for the district, on Wetherby Road.

== Foundation ==
This area of Yorkshire had many RAF bases during the Second World War. In particular, No 6 RCAF Bomber Group had headquarters at Allerton Park in nearby Knaresborough.

An area of the municipal cemetery was set aside for use as a war cemetery at the start of the war and received burials, mostly from after July 1943, mostly airmen, mostly Canadians, until after the end of the war. Burials are from northern airfields and the military wing of the now demolished Harrogate General Hospital in Starbeck.

Within the cemetery, there are burials of or special memorials to 23 First World War troops which are dispersed across the municipal part of the cemetery.

== Notable graves ==
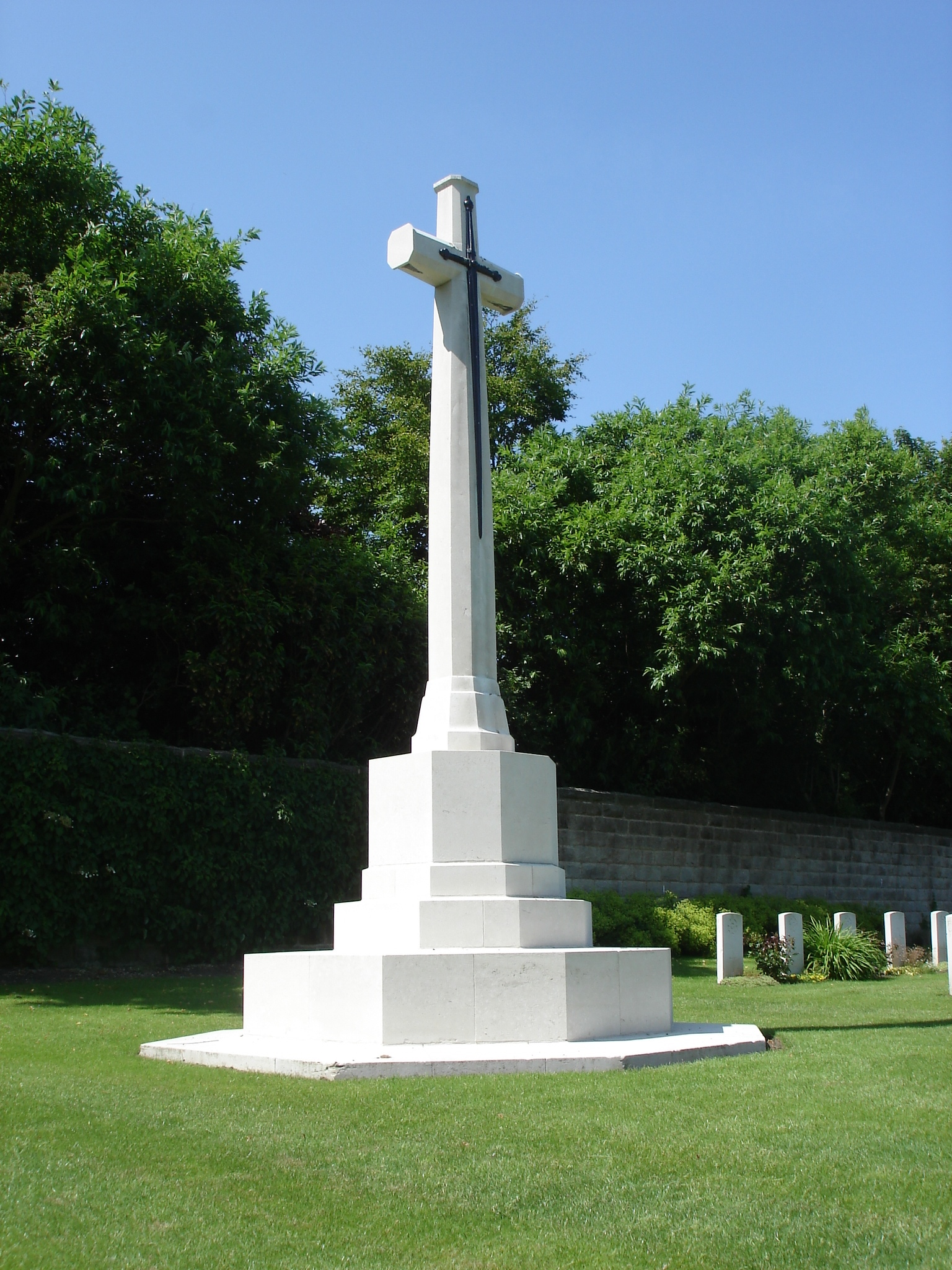
Cross of Sacrifice, Harrogate Military Cemetery

Many of the burials are from aircrews killed in training or on the ground or who died later in the local hospital. Amongst the burials in the cemetery are three (all Canadians) of the seven crew of a Lancaster bomber that crashed on Helmsley Moor on the morning of 17 May 1944. Five burials (all serving in the RCAF, but two were from the United States) in adjoining plots are of the crew of Halifax bomber EB203, which crashed into a railway bridge in Bishop Monkton on 15 April 1944. Also buried here is Flight Lieutenant Vincent Parker, fighter ace and serial prisoner of war camp escaper of World War II, who was killed in a test flying accident in 1946. and Brian Sinclair, the inspiration for the character of Tristan Farnon in All Creatures Great and Small. World War I Victoria Cross recipient Frederick William Hedges was cremated there in 1954.

== Special memorials ==
A special memorial commemorates six First World War troops whose graves are in local churchyards around Yorkshire and cannot be maintained by the commission. The actual grave of one of those commemorated, Edgar Audsley, has since been destroyed as part of development works on the site of South Ossett Baptist Burial Ground.

A plaque in the cemetery records the names of 12 servicemen of the Second World War who were cremated at Harrogate Crematorium.
