= Battle of the Selle =

1918 battle during the First World War

- Part of the Hundred Days Offensive of World War I
Date	17–25 October 1918
Location	Selle River, France
Result	Allied victory

Belligerents
British Empire: Canada; New Zealand; South Africa; United Kingdom; United States	German Empire

Commanders and leaders
(United Kingdom of Great Britain and Ireland) Henry Horne (United Kingdom of Great Britain and Ireland) Julian Byng (United Kingdom of Great Britain and Ireland) Henry Rawlinson (United States) George Windle Read	(German Empire) Erich Ludendorff

Strength
(United Kingdom of Great Britain and Ireland) 1st, 2nd, 3rd and 4th armies	

The Battle of the Selle (17–25 October 1918) took place between Allied forces and the German Army, fought during the Hundred Days Offensive of World War I.

== Prelude ==
After the Second Battle of Cambrai, the Allies advanced almost 2 miles (3.2 km) and liberated the French towns of Naves and Thun-Saint-Martin. Although the capture of Cambrai was achieved much sooner than expected and with moderately low casualties, German resistance northeast of the town stiffened along the German Army's temporary defensive structures, the 'Hermann Stellung Line I and II'.

By 11 October, the Fourth Army had closed in on the retreating Germans near Le Cateau, with the Germans taking up a new position, immediately to the east of the Selle River. General Henry Rawlinson was faced with three problems: crossing the river, the railway embankment on the far side and the ridge above the embankment. The decision was made to commence the assault at night, and as the river was not very wide at this point, planks would be used for the soldiers to cross in single file. Later, pontoons would be required for the artillery to cross the river. Field Marshal Douglas Haig, aware that the Germans were near exhaustion, initiated a series of operations designed to get British troops in strength across the river and clear a way for a move against the Sambre–Oise Canal, a further 5 miles (8.0 km) to the east.

== Battle ==
After a six-day halt for preparations and artillery bombardments, Fourth Army troops attacked at 5.20 a.m. on Thursday 17 October. On 16 October the US 30th Infantry Division moved up into position between the US 27th Infantry Division and the British IX Corps. Infantry and tanks, preceded by a creeping barrage, the American forces waded across the Selle, moving forward on a 10 miles (16 km) front south of Le Cateau (site of the famous 1914 rearguard) with the 27th Division to the north, and the 30th to the south. The Germans had dug in along lines indicated on their maps as Stellung I and II. This combined British Fourth Army forced crossings of the river, despite unexpectedly strong German resistance and much uncut barbed wire. Fighting was particularly fierce along the line of the Le Cateau–Wassigny railway. The Americans attacked from the center, with the 50th British division to their north, the British 6th Division to the south, made most progress and by nightfall the German defences had been broken and Le Cateau captured. Fighting continued from 18–19 October, by which time Fourth Army, much assisted by the French First Army on its right, advanced over 5 miles (8.0 km), harrying the Germans back towards the Sambre–Oise Canal. On the left, First Army advanced forward in the area of the Selle's confluence with the Escaut/Scheldt. Here, at the northern edge of the attack front, the Canadian Corps pushed across the Canal de la Sensée on the 18th and captured Denain on the 19th, securing the flank for the push across the Selle.

The British Third and First Armies, north of the Fourth Army, maintained the offensive pressure the following day. In a surprise joint night attack in the early morning of 20 October, Third Army formations secured the high ground east of the Selle and, further securing the left flank, the Canadians swept around the city of Valenciennes in the north. Following a two-day pause, to bring up heavy artillery, the attack was renewed on 23 October with a major combined assault by Fourth, Third and First Armies; the fighting, which continued into the next day, resulted in further advances. At this stage, the German Army was retreating at a forced but controlled pace. On 24 October, the German Army counterattacked at the Canal de la Dérivation but were repulsed and pushed back by the Belgian Army.

== Aftermath ==
Lt. Frederick William Hedges was awarded the Victoria Cross for his actions during the battle.

Field Marshal Sir Douglas Haig sent the Commander of the II American Corps a congratulatory message on 20 October acknowledging the AEF contributions to the battle. "all ranks of the 27th and the 30th American Divisions under your command displayed an energy, courage, and determination in attack that proved irresistible... You have earned the lasting esteem and admiration of your British comrades in arms, whose success you have so nobly shared."

On 26 October, Erich Ludendorff, First Quartermaster General of the German army, resigned under pressure from Kaiser Wilhelm II.

== Commemoration ==
- The actions of the Canadian Corps in the battle are commemorated at the Canadian Bourlon Wood Memorial.

== In popular culture ==
- In the video game Battlefield 1, there is a map called "Giant's Shadow" that is based on the Battle of the Selle. Later in the game's life a weapon skin called "the Selle" was added.
