= Frederick William Hedges =

British soldier

- Born: 22 Nov 1896; Ambala, British India
- Died: 29 May 1954 (aged 57); Harrogate, West Riding of Yorkshire, England
- Military career
- Allegiance: United Kingdom
- Branch: British Army
- Service years: 1914–1920
- Rank: Captain
- Service number: 2182
- Units: London Regiment; Bedfordshire Regiment; Northamptonshire Regiment (attached); Home Guard
- Conflicts: First World War: First Battle of Ypres; Battle of the Ancre; Battle of Arras; Battle of the Selle
- Awards: Victoria Cross

Captain Frederick William Hedges VC (22 November 1896 – 29 May 1954) was a British recipient of the Victoria Cross, the highest and most prestigious award for gallantry in the face of the enemy that can be awarded to British and Commonwealth forces. A soldier with The Bedfordshire Regiment during the First World War, he was awarded the VC for his actions on 24 October 1918, during the Battle of the Selle.

== Early life ==
Frederick Hedges was born on 22 November 1896 at Ambala in India, the seventh of nine children of Mr and Mrs H.D. Hedges. His father was serving in the British Army as a bandmaster, having done so for many years. By 1901, the Hedges family was living in Hounslow, Middlesex. He was educated at Grove Road Boys' School, and Isleworth County School.

== First World War ==
On the outbreak of the First World War in August 1914, Hedges volunteered for the British Army and was posted as a rifleman to the 9th (County of London) Battalion, London Regiment (Queen Victoria's Rifles), with whom he would serve for the next few months. His service number at this point was 2182. The battalion was part of the 13th Infantry Brigade, 5th Division, and, in November 1914, it was sent to the Western Front in France where it served for several months, including during the First Battle of Ypres. Hedges suffered frostbite and was evacuated to England in January 1915 for treatment. He had recovered within a couple of months and returned to the London Regiment.

Hedges was commissioned into the Bedfordshire Regiment in July 1915 and after a period of training at Felixstowe, served as a musketry instructor for several months in England. However, in September 1916, he returned to the Western Front, this time to the 6th (Service) Battalion, Bedfordshire Regiment. He fought in the Battle of the Ancre in November 1916 and in the Battle of Arras the following year, during which he was wounded in the right hand. After a period of treatment at Rouen, he was sent to England for further medical care at Portsmouth and then at Osbourne House at the Isle of Wight.

Hedges, by now a lieutenant (having been promoted to that rank in July 1917), did not return to the frontlines until September 1918, having served briefly as a machine gun instructor on recovering from his wounds. He was attached to the 6th Battalion, The Northamptonshire Regiment, as his original unit, the 6th Bedfords, had been disbanded. On 24 October 1918, the battalion was involved in the Battle of the Selle. Leading a company of the battalion near the village of Hecq, northeast of Bousies, Hedges, with his NCO, Sjt Fred Gibson, captured two machinegun posts that were holding up the advance. They took 14 prisoners. A few days later, during an engagement in the Mormal Forest, he was wounded in the head and shoulder. He was evacuated to England for treatment on 8 November 1918. For his actions on 24 October he was awarded the Victoria Cross (VC). The VC, instituted in 1856, was the highest award for valour that could be bestowed on a soldier of the British Empire. The citation for Hedge's VC read:

For most conspicuous bravery and initiative during the operations north-east of Bousies on the 24th October, 1918. He led his company with great skill towards the final objective, maintaining direction under the most difficult conditions. When the advance was held up by machine-gun posts, accompanied by one Serjeant and followed at some considerable distance by a Lewis-gun section, he again advanced and displayed the greatest determination, capturing six machine guns and 14 prisoners. His gallantry and initiative enabled the whole line to advance, and tended largely to the success of subsequent operations.

— The London Gazette, 28 January 1919

Sergeant F. Gibson was awarded the Distinguished Conduct Medal for his role in accompanying Hedges.

Following his recovery, he received his VC in a ceremony at Buckingham Palace on 15 May 1919. The next month, he was placed in command of a prisoner of war camp in Guildford. Not long afterwards, he married his fiancée, Mollie née Kenworthy, in Hounslow, Middlesex. In late September, he was injured in a motorbike accident and suffered a fractured leg. He was discharged from the British Army before the end of the year.

== Later life ==
After leaving military service, Hedges found employment with the Cornhill Insurance Company. He was instrumental in the setting up of a memorial to former students of his old school at Isleworth County who had been killed during the war and was also involved in the British Legion. In 1924, his first son, John Grosvenor Hedges, was born. During the Second World War, both father and son served in the Home Guard. However, in 1941, John died in a drowning accident on the River Thames, aged just 17.

After the war, Hedges and his wife moved to Harrogate to be near Leeds where he was to run Cornhill's office there. He was never at ease with the shift and he became affected by depression. On 29 May 1954, the anniversary of John's death, he committed suicide, hanging himself at his home. His mental state had worsened since he had to take early retirement from his work. His remains were cremated at Stonefall Cemetery, Harrogate.

== Victoria Cross ==
After his death, Hedges' medals, which in addition to the VC, also included the 1914 Star, the Victory Medal, the British War Medal, and the 1937 and 1953 Coronation Medals, were loaned to the Leeds City Museum. They are now in the care of Bedfordshire and Hertfordshire Regiment, displayed at the gallery located in Wardown Park Museum, Luton, Bedfordshire.

== Bibliography ==
- Ashcroft, Michael (2007) [2006]. Victoria Cross Heroes. Headline Review. ISBN 978-0-7553-1633-5.
- Gliddon, Gerald (2014) [2000]. The Final Days 1918. VCs of the First World War. The History Press. ISBN 978-0-7509-5368-9.
- Whitworth, Alan (2012). Yorkshire VCs. Pen and Sword Books. ISBN 978-1-84884-778-1.
