= Geoffrey D. Stephenson =

Royal Air Force officer

Air Commodore Geoffrey D. Stephenson CBE
- Born: Geoffrey Dalton Stephenson; 19 January 1910
- Died: 8 November 1954 (aged 44)
- Military career
- Allegiance: United Kingdom
- Branch: Royal Air Force
- Rank: Air Commodore
- Commands: Central Flying School; Central Fighter Establishment
- Conflicts: Second World War

Air Commodore Geoffrey Dalton Stephenson, CBE (19 January 1910 – 8 November 1954) was a senior Royal Air Force officer. He served as Commandant of the Central Flying School and Central Fighter Establishment, and Aide-de-Camp to the monarch.

Commanding a squadron during the Dunkirk evacuation May 26, 1940, Stephenson was shot down, crash-landed his Spitfire on the beach and ten days later, surrendered to the Germans. The German pilot who shot him down was Erich Rudorffer. Stephenson was Rudorffer's fifth aerial victory. Rudorffer went on the achieve 222 aerial victories and survived the war, dying at the age of 98 in 2016. Stephenson was killed in an air crash on 8 November 1954 while on a RAF tour of the United States.

== Background ==
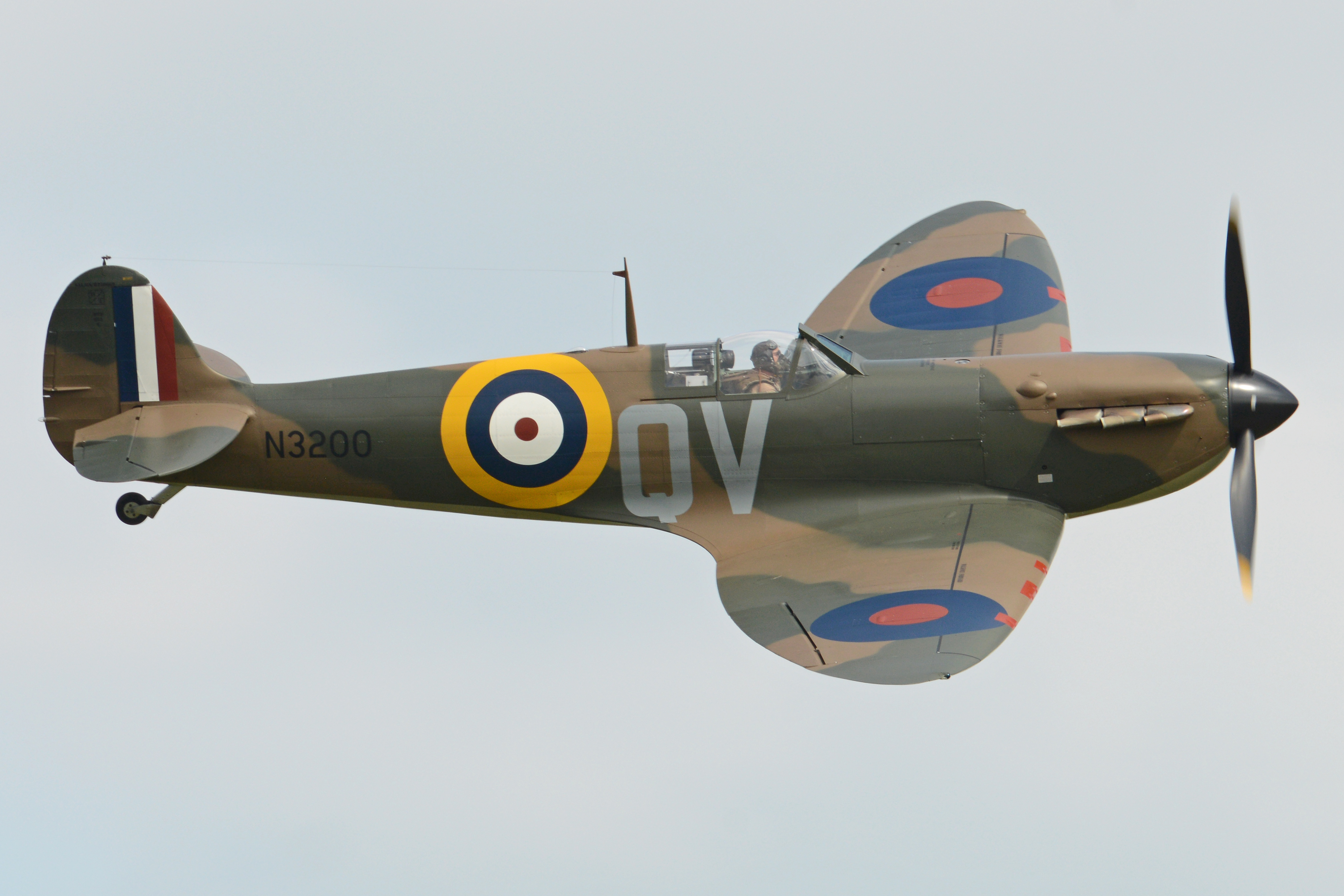
Stephenson's Spitfire, 'N3200 QV', performing at an air show in 2017

The 44-year-old pilot had flown several thousand hours in fighter aircraft, both piston and jet powered, during his 20-year RAF career. He had piloted virtually every type of British jet fighter including Meteors, Venoms, Hunters and Swifts, as well as USAF F-86s. He was considered one of the most experienced and capable fighter pilots in the RAF. Air Commodore Stephenson was married to Anne Jean Maureen Booth (Maureen), the daughter of Sir Paul and Lady Booth and father of three children: Anna, Victoria and Veryan. Stephenson was best friends with the famous RAF ace, Douglas Bader, who was best man for Geoffrey and Maureen's wedding.

External videos
- Dunkirk, the Ending scene. Pilots from 19 squadron including Stephenson, Kenny Hart and Alan Deere force-landed their aeroplanes on the beaches.

Before the Second World War, Stephenson had been a member of the Royal Air Force aerobatic team. As officer commanding 19 Squadron, based at RAF Duxford, he was shot down on Sunday, 26 May 1940. He had been flying Spitfire Ia, N3200, coded 'QV', while covering the British evacuation of the Dunkirk beaches, as part of Operation Dynamo. He belly-landed his fighter on the beach sands at the tideline at Sangatte, several miles southwest of Dunkirk. Uninjured, Stephenson was at large for more than a week, before he finally surrendered to the Germans.

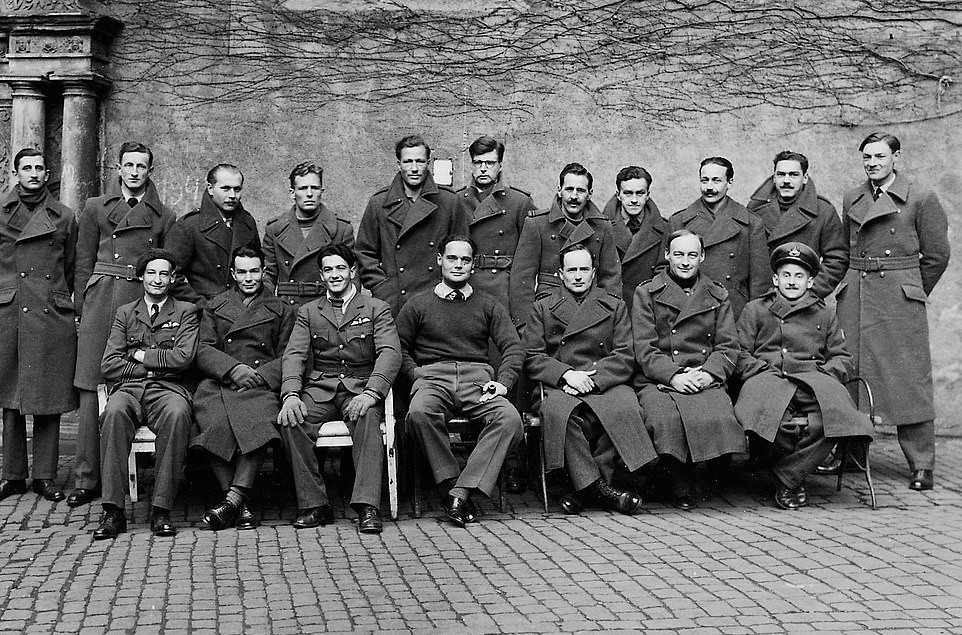
RAF mess at Colditz. Stephenson is seated second from the left. Also shown, F/Lt Albert van Rood (fifth from left, standing), F/Lt John Patrick 'Bag' Dickinson, (first left sitting), F/Lt Vincent 'Bushy' Parker (sitting 3rd from left), Douglas Bader (sitting, centre), also shown Dominic Bruce (sitting, furthest right)

After residing at several different POW camps, he was transferred to Oflag IV-C at Colditz Castle for several years, where he would participate in the creation of the never-flown Colditz Cock glider. Following the war, Stephenson served as the personal pilot to King George VI and Queen Elizabeth II.

Remarkably, Spitfire N3200 was rediscovered and salvaged from the beach in 1986. In 2014, N3200 was restored to flight by the Aircraft Restoration Company workshops at the Imperial War Museum at Duxford airfield in Cambridgeshire. N3200 was restored with the same markings worn when it was downed.. N3200 is now a featured exhibit in the Imperial War Museum display at Duxford.

== Fatal crash ==
Air Commodore Stephenson headed a six-man team from the central fighter establishment, RAF, whose headquarters are at RAF West Raynham near Fakenham, Norfolk. They were at Eglin Air Force Base, Florida, home of the Air Proving Ground Center, on an exchange tour.

On 8 November 1954, Air Commodore Stephenson was flying a USAF F-100A-10-NA Super Sabre, 53-1534, near Auxiliary Field 2 of Eglin Air Force Base, Florida. He was flying at 13,000 ft (4,000 m) as he joined formation with another F-100, flown by Capt. Lonnie R. Moore, jet ace of the Korean campaign, when his fighter dropped into a steep spiral, impacting at ~14:14 in a pine forest on the Eglin Reservation, one mile NE of the runway of Pierce Field, Auxiliary Fld. 2. Stephenson was killed instantly. The F-100A Super Sabre was a new jet fighter design. Several aircraft design and equipment failures were later identified in the crash inquiry, and the F-100 was grounded by the USAF until the design flaws were corrected.

== Funeral ==
Memorial services were held at 0900 hrs. at the Eglin Base chapel on 10 November 1954, conducted by the Rev. Johnson H. Pace of St. Simons on the Sound church, Fort Walton Beach, Florida, and attended by Air Vice-Marshal R. L. R. Atcherley, chief of the Chief Joint British Services Mission to the United States, who arrived from Washington on the night of 9 November; Major General Patrick W Timberlake, commander of the Air Proving Ground Command; Brig. Gen. Daniel S. Campbell, deputy commander of the APGC; six Royal Air Force officers who were touring the U.S. with the Air Commodore; and key staff officers of the APGC. At 1200 hrs., the party of Air Commodore Stephenson, accompanied by 30 RAF and USAF officers, flew to Maxwell Air Force Base, Montgomery, Alabama, for interment at the Royal Air Force plot there. British armed forces traditionally bury their dead where they fall. There has been an RAF squad at Maxwell since World War II.
