= John Chrisp =

Royal Navy sailor

John ‘Bosun’ Chrisp (1908–2006) MBE RN was a British author, Royal Navy sailor, a World War II veteran and a Colditz survivor. Chrisp wrote three books on his exploits, two on his WWII experience and one on his experiences as a post war whaler. In WWII he was captured and as a POW Chrisp, after two escape attempts was eventually noted as an incorrigible and sent to high security Colditz. Chrisp, as a skilled ropeman, became an invaluable asset for his escaping comrades inside the castle. His rope skills played a part in the famous ‘Franz Joseph’ escape. He was also noted for his role in the 1944 sewer escape attempt inside Colditz castle which made use of his bosun rope skills and which resulted in he and two others being faced by a firing squad. His personal views and the views of others on his contribution in WWII have been captured in the WWII literature. Views on his participation in WWII have also been recorded and some of these recordings are held in the sound and video archives at the Imperial War Museums. In his later life he also trained sailors on the training ship Foudroyant in the 1950s and 1960s.

== Sources ==
- Chrisp MBE RN, John 'Bosun' (1959). The Tunnellers of Sandborstal. United Kingdom: Robert Hale.
- Chancellor, Henry (2001). Colditz: The Definitive History. London, UK: Hodder & Stoughton. ISBN 978-0-34079-494-4.
- Windle, David (8 August 2000). "Chrisp, John 'Bosun'(Oral history)(Catalogue number 29192)"". iwm.org.uk. Imperial War Museum.
- Windfall Films (1999). "Chrisp, John 'Bosun'(Oral history)(Catalogue number 21748)"". iwm.org.uk. Imperial War Museum.
- Wood, Conrad (13 September 1996). "Chrisp, John 'Bosun'(Oral history)(Catalogue number 16843)"". iwm.org.uk. Imperial War Museum.
- Noble, Peter (2012). "Lieutenant Commander John Chrisp" (PDF). friendsofhmstrincomalee.org.uk.
