= Cecil Hight =

Cecil Henry Hight
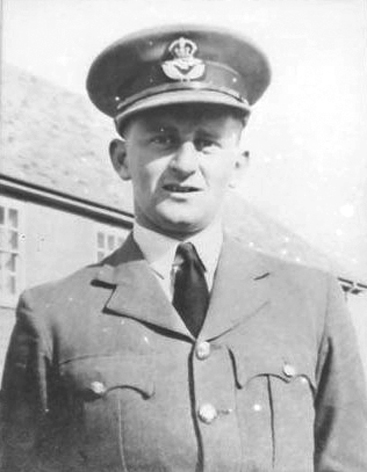
- Cecil Henry Hight
- Born: Cecil Henry Hight; 6 September 1917; New Zealand
- Died: 15 August 1940 (aged 22); Bournemouth
- Burial place: Bournemouth East Cemetery
- Relatives: Herbert Edward Hight (Father); Emma Hight (née Anderson) (Mother)
- Military career
- Allegiance: New Zealand
- Branch: Royal Air Force
- Service years: 1939-1940
- Rank: Pilot Officer
- Unit: 234 Squadron
- Conflicts: World War II: Battle of Britain

Pilot Officer Cecil Henry Hight (6 September 1917 – 15 August 1940) was a New Zealand born fighter pilot who served with the Royal Air Force during World War II. He was killed in action during the Battle of Britain.

== Early life ==
Hight was born on 6 September 1917 to Herbert Edward Hight and Emma Hight (née Anderson), of East Road, Stratford, Taranaki, New Zealand. In his teens he was educated at Stratford Technical High School. As a youngster he helped with his father's milkround, and after he left school he became a car salesman.

Hight learned to fly with Stratford Aero Club, obtaining his 'A' Licence at the Western Federated Aero Club in August 1937. A photo from the Stratford Aero Club archives show him with his 'wings' badge awarded to those who are qualified to fly solo.

== Military career ==
In early 1938, Hight worked his passage to England to join the Royal Air Force. He failed to meet the educational requirements, so took a cramming course in mathematics and on reapplication was provisionally accepted for a short service commission. He began training on 6 January 1939, was made Acting Pilot Officer on probation on 15 April, and completed training becoming Pilot Officer on probation on 6 November.

Hight joined 234 Squadron at RAF Leconfield in Yorkshire, which was re-forming with Blenheims, but from March 1940 re-equipped with Spitfires. During the Battle of Britain he flew Spitfires with 234 Squadron out of RAF Middle Wallop.

=== Death ===
On Thursday 15 August 1940 a massive German raid of 70 bombers escorted by around 200 fighters was spotted off Portland in Dorset. The warning sirens sounded at 5.20pm in Bournemouth. 234 Squadron, including Pilot Officer Hight, was scrambled to repel the attack. Around 6pm his Spitfire, R6988, was hit over Bournemouth.

It is claimed that, in order to avoid inflicting casualties on the ground, Hight piloted his stricken plane away from the built up area of the town and towards Meyrick Park. He bailed out as the plane came down but his parachute did not open. His body was found under a hedge in the grounds of Hambledon on Leven Avenue. He may well have been already dead from machine gun wounds before he hit the ground. He was 22 years old. His plane crashed less than fifty yards away and created a crater on the corner of Leven Avenue and Walsford Road.

Canon Hedley Burrows, vicar of St Peter's, arrived and said a prayer for the dead pilot where he lay. The owners of Hambledon, Alfred and Edith Hoare, created a garden of remembrance on the spot where Hight had landed.

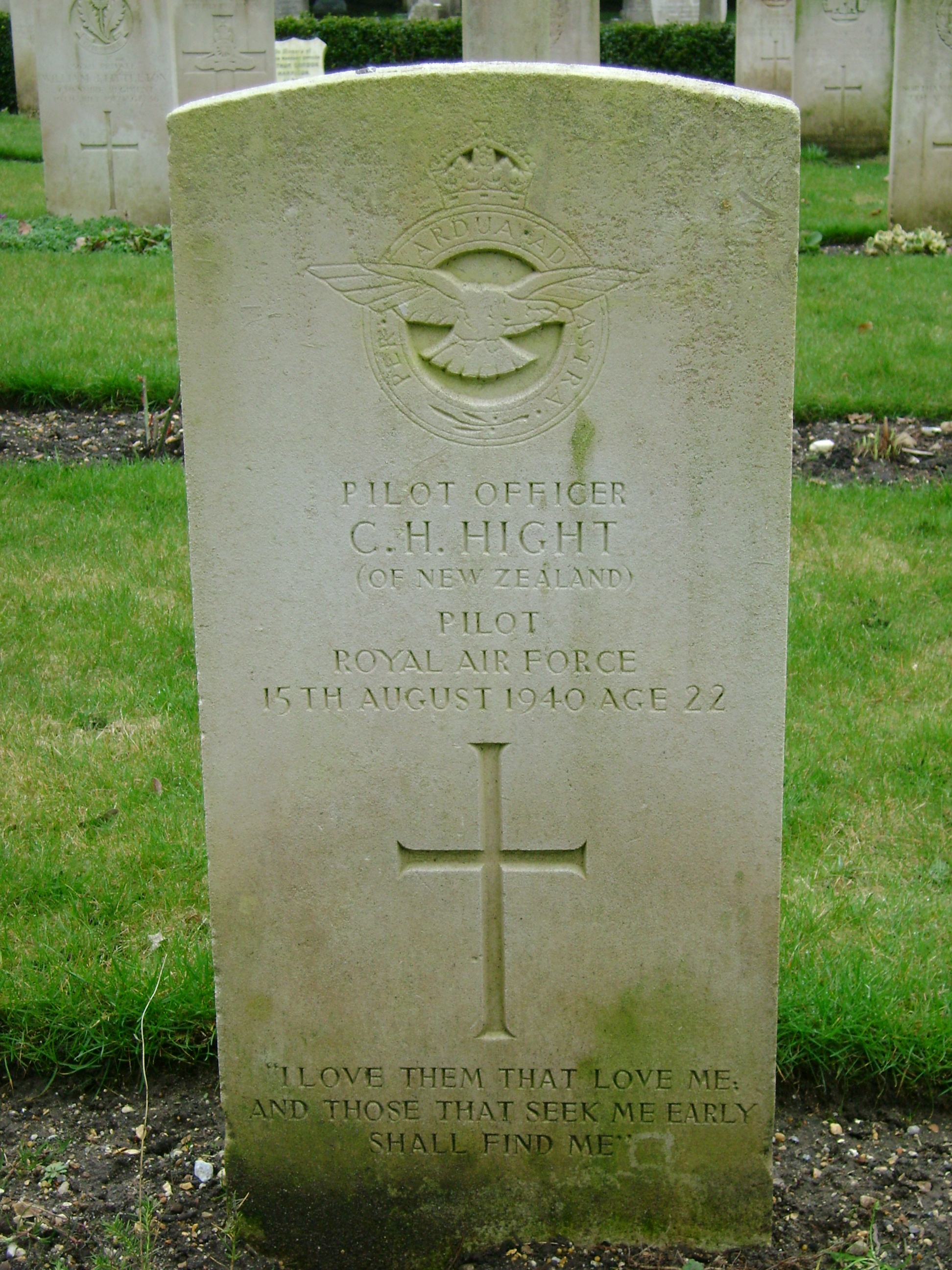
Cecil Hight's grave

Hight's funeral was held on 19 August, conducted by Canon Headley Burrows. His coffin was carried by six RAF officers and draped with the British and New Zealand flags, and his uniform cap. He was buried with military honours including a firing volley and officers' salute. Among the wreaths was a bunch of flowers from the garden where he fell. He is buried in an area of Commonwealth War Graves in Bournemouth East Cemetery. His family chose a quotation from the Book of Proverbs for his headstone, 'I love them that love me, and those that seek me early shall find me'.

Hambledon, the house in whose garden Hight's body landed, was itself bombed in an air raid just before midnight on the night of 14 November 1940. Alfred and Edith Hoare were both dug out of the rubble, but Alfred died on the way to hospital. He was pronounced dead at the Royal Victoria Hospital in Bournemouth on the 15th, and is buried in Wimborne Road Cemetery. The Hoares' garden of remembrance continued to be tended by local people.

== Memorials ==
Like the rest of The Few, Cecil Hight is commemorated on the Battle of Britain Memorial, Capel-le-Ferne, and the Battle of Britain Monument in London.

A memorial service for Cecil Hight was held at St Peter's Church on 7 April 1943. The New Zealand High Commissioner unveiled a plaque of RAF brevet wings with 'NZ' in the centre, designed and carved from Kauri wood by the pupils of Hight's old school, Stratford Technical High, in New Zealand. The service was broadcast live to New Zealand and heard by Hight's mother.

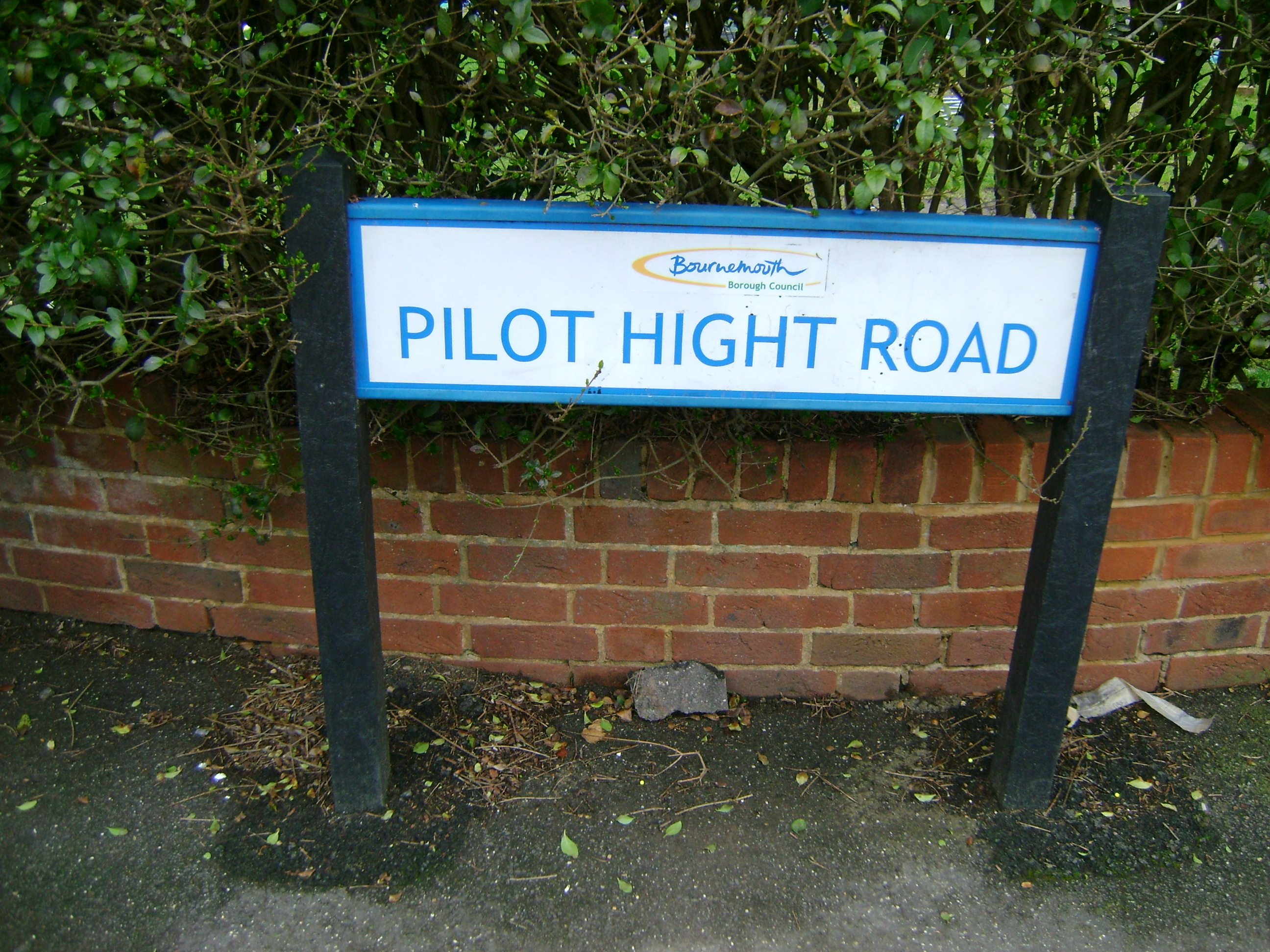
Pilot Hight Road sign in Bournemouth

A new memorial stone was unveiled on 15 August 2015 at the junction of Walsford Road, Benellen Avenue and Leven Avenue, Bournemouth by the Mayor of Bournemouth. Pilot Officer Hight died close to this site.

The Municipal Buildings in Stratford has a Hall of Remembrance which displays photos and names of the area's dead from the world wars, including Cecil Hight.

Bournemouth council named a road in West Howe "Pilot Hight Road". In 2010, new street signs were installed carrying an image of a Spitfire.

On 15 August 2020, the 80th anniversary of his death, a service of remembrance was held at his grave.
