= William Punch =

Australian serviceman (1880–1917)

William Joseph Punch
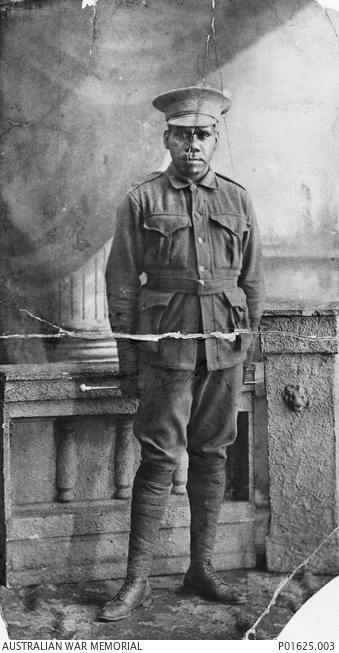
- William Joseph Punch
- Born: 31 March 1880; Bland River, New South Wales, Australia
- Died: 29 August 1917 (aged 37); Bournemouth, England
- Military career
- Allegiance: Australian
- Branch: Australian Imperial Force
- Service years: 1915–1917
- Rank: Private
- Nickname: Punch
- Service number: 5435
- Units: 1st Battalion, 53rd Battalion
- Conflicts: First World War

Private William Joseph Punch (31 March 1880 – 29 August 1917) was a Wiradjuri serviceman, who as a baby, was the only survivor of the Bland River massacre. He fought in World War One with the First Australian Imperial Force.

== Early life ==
Punch was Wiradjuri, born in the Bland River region of New South Wales on 31 March 1880.

He was the sole survivor of the Bland Creek massacre, near west Wyalong that occurred shortly after his birth. A group of Wiradjuri people had allegedly killed and eaten local cattle introduced to the region by a group of cattlemen including John Siggs. They were massacred in retaliation. Siggs was not present at the massacre. He is said to have discovered Punch as a baby among the bodies of his family, upon visiting the site the following morning, taking him to his home in Pejar. Siggs told the story that he had brought the child back from north Queensland to obscure this history of colonial violence or possibly to deter Punch from later seeking out any remaining family. Accounts from elderly Goulburn residents to local historians later discounted Punch’s north Queensland origins.

Punch was raised as part of the Siggs family in Goulburn, where he attended school. He was an accomplished cricketer and played the violin. He then worked as a farm labourer.

== First World War ==
After the outbreak of the First World War, Punch enlisted in the Australian Imperial Force at Goulburn on 31 December 1915. Unlike many Aboriginal and Torres Strait Islander people who enlisted, Punch openly declared his identity as 'Aboriginal'.

After training locally, he joined the 17th reinforcements to the 1st Battalion. He boarded the HMAT Ceramic on 14 April 1916, arriving in Egypt to train at Tel-el-Kebir.

At the end of July, he then went to England before sailing for France, where he joined the 1st Battalion in Erie Camp west of Ypres in Belgium. It is recorded that Punch committed the crime of "Losing by neglect his General Coat valued at 30/3” on 11 November 1916. He was described as popular among the men and as the 'mascot' of his battalion.

In September his battalion were in the front line, where he sustained a shrapnel wound to the head. After recovering in Boulogne, he re-joined his battalion who soon moved back to France. He was evacuated again with trench foot, returning to the battalion again in April 1917, where he was shot in his right buttock. Developing several other conditions, he deteriorated at Mont Dore Military Hospital and died of pneumonia on 29 August, at the age of 37. Shortly before medical staff helped him dictate his will, which from weakness due to illness, he signed with an “X”.

He was buried with full military honours with a firing party from the New Zealand Engineers. Wreaths were sent by friends, patients and medical staff who cared for Punch.

== Legacy ==
Punch's story is exhibited at the Australian War Memorial in Canberra. It was told as part of the Last Post Ceremony on 3 December 2014. His name is featured on the Crookwell War Memorial.

Punch's story has gained prominence with growing recognition of the contribution and service of Aboriginal and Torres Strait Islander people in Australia's military history. It was the subject of a local theatre production by the Lieder Theatre Company in Goulburn in 2015. Punch was painted by artist Vincent Namatjira as part of the APY Art Centre Collective's touring exhibition Weapons for the Soldier in 2018.

== Notes ==
1.His service records show his birth place as Queensland.
