= Australian Society of Magicians =

Professional body of magicians in Australia

- Formation: 1907; 119 years ago
- Type: Non-profit
- Headquarters: Sydney, Australia
- President: Mark Mayer
- Website: www.magicians.org.au

Australian Society of Magicians is an organisation for professional and amateur stage magicians, with approximately 1,000 members worldwide. The headquarters is in Sydney, Australia but it has branches all over the country. It is the oldest magical society in the Southern Hemisphere and the fourth-oldest in the world.

On January 15, 1909, close to the date of founding, the ASM started the publication of their official organ, The Magic Mirror, an eight page printed magazine. It was the first magic magazine in the Southern hemisphere.

== See also ==
- Australian Institute of Magic
