= Julius Green =

Captain Julius Green
- Born: Julius Morris Green; 1912; Killarney, Ireland
- Died: September 1990 (aged 77–78)
- Military career
- Allegiance: British Army
- Rank: Captain
- Service number: 79453
- Unit: 51st (Highland) Division

Captain Julius Morris Green (1912–1990) was a British prisoner of war who worked as a spy for MI9 during his time at Colditz Castle. Born in Ireland to a Jewish family, Green moved to Dunfermline at a young age and studied to become a dentist in Edinburgh. He moved to Glasgow following his graduation to work as a dentist, before joining the Territorial Army upon the start of the Second World War.

Green's brigade was captured in June 1940 at St. Valéry-en-Caux, and he spent months travelling between prisoner-of-war camps providing dental work for fellow prisoners-of-war as well as German troops. Eventually, British intelligence agency MI9 recruited him as a spy to relay information from these camps to assist in rescue efforts and strategic operations. He would write coded letters to his family and friends in Scotland, which would then be analysed by MI9 for secret messages informing them of goings-on within the camps.

After the war, Green married and moved back to Glasgow and worked as a businessman then, later, as a dentist. He wrote a best-selling book about his experiences titled From Colditz In Code (1971). Green's letters were auctioned as part of a mixed lot in June 2015, along with photographs from his camp, and sold for £6,500. Green died in September 1990 at the age of 77.

== Life ==
Green was born to a Jewish family in Killarney, a town in County Kerry in Ireland, though some sources say he was born in Carlisle, England. He eventually moved to Dunfermline in Scotland, and studied dentistry at the Dental School of the Royal College of Surgeons of Edinburgh. Upon his graduation he moved to Glasgow to work in dentistry.

Upon the onset of the Second World War in 1939, Green joined the Medical Unit of the Edinburgh University Officer Training Corps, part of the Territorial Army (now known as the Army Reserve). He joined the medical unit of the Glaswegian 51st (Highland) Division where he served in the 152 (Highland) Field Ambulance.

=== Capture and spy work ===
On 12 June 1940, Green and his brigade were captured at St. Valery-en-Caux, after Major General Victor Fortune and French troops surrendered to Erwin Rommel. He travelled from camp to camp—staying at Blechhammer, Lamsdorf, Sandbostel, Westertimke, and Heyderbreck—providing dental work for both German troops and fellow prisoners of war, and eventually ended up at Colditz Castle. He had to hide his Judaism from troops there, disposing of his identity tags and claiming to be Presbyterian; at one stage, he narrowly escaped punishment for this deception through an assertion from Captain Hugh Dickie, a Medical Officer, that he had been circumcised for medical reasons.

Shortly after his capture, MI9, a department of the War Office which routinely communicated with PoWs, recruited Green as a spy. His role was to communicate between Colditz and London through coded letters. Letters he sent to his family in Dunfermline between 1941 and 1944 would contain lines that were, to native speakers, effectively nonsense; however, these were coded messages to be decrypted by Intelligence staff in London. MI9 provided his family draft letters to send back to the camp, as well as some from fictional correspondents invented by the War Office.

German soldiers staffing the PoW camps only possessed a limited knowledge of English, so the code remained undetected. The letters contained information that was seemingly innocent—in one, he wrote about a relationship with made-up girlfriend "Philippa". He provided information on Germany troop movements and railways lines, what troops should bring with them should they too be captured, as well as which materials should be sent to Colditz to help PoWs escape. He also exposed an English Nazi informant through his work, who after the war was prosecuted for treason.

MI9 explained the system to his family in Dunfermline in one letter:

"You will see that in lines 20, 21 and 22 your son refers to certain matters which will have no meaning for you. These remarks are intended for us, so please do not worry about them, nor refer to them in any way when replying to your son. For your private information, we are very glad to tell you that your son is continuing to do most valuable work. Please do not show this letter to anyone outside the immediate family circle and remember to burn our letter when read."

They wrote again in 1944 to assure them Green was "a young man of great resource" and urging them to "try not to worry".

=== Post-war life ===
After his release, Green moved back to Scotland, and was engaged to Anne Miller of Glasgow in 1945. Some of his letters were eventually donated to the Imperial War Museum in London. He worked as a businessman before returning to dentistry, and in 1971, wrote a best-selling book about his experiences as a spy, From Colditz With Code. A 1989 edition of the book was dedicated to his son, Alan. He died in September 1990, aged 77.

A collection of forty letters sent to and from Colditz, as well as photographs and imagery of Green and other PoWs, were auctioned by Bonhams in Knightsbridge, London, on 18 June 2014, with an estimated sale price of between £4,000 and £6,000. Spokesperson Julien Roup said that "the risks he was running, as a Jewish prisoner-of-war in Nazi hands, hardly bear thinking about. Under the surreal humour of his letters lies horror and quite extraordinary bravery." The lot was ultimately sold for £6,500.
