= Bibliography of Colditz Castle =

Bibliography of Colditz Castle is a list of works about Colditz Castle, its history as POW camp Oflag IV-C, the attempts to escape Oflag IV-C and many prisoners memoirs.

== Books in whole or in part about Colditz POW camp ==
Author(s)	Title	Publisher	Date (original publication)	Language (original)	Remarks
Baybutt, Ron	Camera in Colditz	London: Holder and Stoughton	1982 [UK]	English	Johannes Lange was a longtime Colditz town resident who took the escape attempt photographs.
Baybutt, Ron	Colditz: The Great Escapes	Boston: Little, Brown	1983 [US]	English	
Booker, Michael	Collecting Colditz and Its Secrets: A Unique Pictorial Record of Life Behind the Walls	London: Grub Street	2005	English	Michael Booker is an avid UK collector of Colditz memorabilia.
Bräuer, A. Peter and Gerhard Weber	Colditz: Sächsische Stadt im Herzen Europas	Bonn: Pontes	1990	German	A detailed history of Colditz town and castle.
Brickhill, Paul	Reach for the Sky: The Story of Douglas Bader, Legless Ace of the Battle of Britain	New York: W.W. Norton	1954	English	Paul Brickhill was a former POW and author of The Great Escape.
Le Brigant, General	Les Indomptables	Paris: Berger-Levrault	1948	French	An early account from the French perspective
Champ, Jack and Colin Burgess	The Diggers of Colditz	Kenthurst: Kangaroo	1997	English	Jack Champ was an Australian Colditz POW.
Chancellor, Henry	Colditz: The Untold Story of World War II's Great Escapes	London: Hodder and Stoughtton	2001	English	Tells prisoners' own stories based on interviews with many of them.
Davies-Scourfield, Gris	In Presence of my Foes: A Memoir of Calais, Colditz, and Wartime Escape Adventures	London: Wilton	1991	English	Gris Davies-Scourfield was a Colditz POW.
Dunn, David	Colditz: A Visitor's Historical Guide: Based on the Book, Colditz: The Inside Story	Wakefield, UK: Lindley Printers	no date	English	Dunn was a Colditz tour guide.
Eggers, Reinhold (Translated and edited by Howard Gee)	Colditz: The German Story.	London: Robert Hale	1961 [UK]	English	Reinhold Eggers was a Colditz duty officer and later Security officer from November 1940 to April 1945. Howard Gee was a journalist and was one of only two civilian prisoners at Colditz.
Eggers, Reinhold (Edited by John Watton)	Escape From Colditz: 16 First-Hand Accounts	London: Robert Hale	1973	English	Reinhold Eggers was a Colditz duty officer and later Security officer from November 1940 to April 1945.
Green, Julius Morris	From Colditz in Code	London: Robert Hale	1971	English	Julius Morris Green was a Colditz POW.
Gigues, Frédéric	Colditz, 1941–1943	Private Publication	1971?	French?	Guigues was a French POW at Colditz
Harewood, Lord	Tongs And Bones: The Memoirs of Lord Harewood	London: Weidenfeld and Nicolson	1981	English	Lord Harewood, George Lascelles, 7th Earl of Harewood, was a Colditz 'Prominenten' POW.
Hartog, Leo de	Officieren achter prikkeldraad	Baarn: Hollandia	1983	Dutch	De Hartog was a Dutch POW and describes the story of Dutch officers in POW camps including Colditz.
Larive, E.H.	The Man Who Came in from Colditz	London: Robert Hale	1975	English	Larive was a Dutch Colditz POW.
Lockwood, Kenneth	Colditz: A Pictorial History	London: Caxton	2001	English	Kenneth Lockwood, Colditz POW, edits this mostly then (and now) picture book.
Mackenzie, S.P	Colditz Myth: British and Commonwealth Prisoners of War in Nazi Germany, The	Oxford: Oxford University Press	2004	English	In this scholarly survey, Mackenzie compares Colditz to other POW camps
Macintyre, Ben	Prisoners of the Castle: An Epic Story of Survival and Escape from Colditz, the Nazis' Fortress Prison	Penguin Random House	2022	English	Macintyre describes the full range of population, emotions, and class issues at Colditz, without triumphalism
Morison, Walter	Flak and Ferrets: One Way to Colditz	London: Sentinel	1995	English	Walter Morison was a British POW sent to Colditz for trying to steal a German airplane after escaping from Stalag Luft III.
Neave, Airey	They Have Their Exits	Boston: Little, Brown & Company	1953	English	Airey Neave was the first British Colditz escapee, and a MI9 member.
Pringle, Jack	Colditz Last Stop: Eleven Prisons, Four Countries, Six Escapes	London: William Kimber	1988	English	Jack Pringle was a Colditz POW.
Reid, Miles	Into Colditz	Salisbury: Michael Russell	1983	English	Miles Reid was a WWI veteran and the oldest British prisoner in Colditz. He escaped by feigning illness and getting himself repatriated.
Reid, Pat	The Colditz Story.	London: Hodder and Stoughton	1952	English	Patrick Reid was a British inmate and escapee. This was his first book and it is the basis for the UK TV Series Colditz, which ran from October, 1972 until April, 1974.
Reid, Pat	Latter Days at Colditz, The [also published as Men of Colditz]	London: Hodder and Stoughton	1953	English	Reid's second book tells of the period after his escape, based on interviews with remaining POWs
Reid, Pat	Escape from Colditz: The Two Classic Escape Stories – The Colditz Story and Men of Colditz – in one Volume	New York: J.B. Lippincott & Co.	?	English	Combines Reid's first two books.
Reid, Pat	Colditz: The Full Story	London: Hodder and Stoughton	1984	English	Reid's last book in his Colditz trilogy.
Reid, Pat	Prisoner of War: The inside Story of the POW from the Ancient World to Colditz and after	New York: Beaufort Books Publishers	1984	English	General survey of POWs through history, including at Colditz
Rogers, Jim	Tunneling into Colditz: A Mining Engineer in Captivity.	London: Robert Hale	1985	English	Jim Rogers was a Colditz POW.
Romilly, Gilles and Michael Alexander	The Privileged Nightmare (Reissued as Hostages of Colditz, New York: Praeger, 1973)	not stated	1954	English	Giles Romilly and Michael Alexander were both 'Prominenten' Colditz POWs.
Schädlich, Thomas, ed.	Colditzer Schloßgeschichten: Die Geschichte des Oflag IV C in Colditz nach dem Tagebuch des Georg Martin Schädlich	Colditz: Swing Druck GmbH	1992	German	Based on the diary of Georg Martin Schädlich, Colditz guard and 'keeper of the keys'
Schädlich, Thomas, ed. (Translation by Wolfgang Ansorge)	Tales from Colditz Castle	Colditz: Thomas Schädlich	2003	English	Translation of the diary of Georg Martin Schädlich
Sternberg, Antony	Vie de Chateau et Oflags de Discipline: Souvenirs de Captivité (Colditz)	Paris: self-published	1960	French	Offers a view of life from the perspective of French Jewish officers
Warren, C.E.T., and James Benson	Will Not We Fear: The Story of H.M. Submarine Seal and of Lieutenant Commander Rupert Lonsdale.	London: George G. Harrap	1961	English	Rupert Lonsdale was a Colditz POW.
Wood, J.E.R., editor	Detour: The Story of Oflag IVC	London: The Falcon Press	1946	English	Edited by a Canadian POW, this was the first postwar book about Colditz to be published. It was illustrated by Lieut. J.F. Watton.
Ziminski, Wladyslaw	Colditz-Dossel ou Le Refus de le Captivite 1940–1943	Pontarlier: Imcopa Faivre	1976	French	Polish POW Ziminski was transferred to Oflag VI-B in Dossel in 1943.

== Other books (where Colditz is at least mentioned) ==
Bader, Douglas.

- Reach for the Sky. London, Glasgow, Collins Books, 1954.

Barry, Rupert.

- "The First Escape of the War." [Escape from Laufen in 1940]

Cash, William.

- "Escape to Colditz". The Spectator, (7 April 1990), pp. 14–15.

Gleeson, Janet.

- The Arcanum: The Extraordinary True Story. New York: Warner Books, 1998.

Graham, Burton.

- Escape from the Nazis. Secaucus, New Jersey: Castle Books, 1975.

Langer, Herbert.

- The Thirty Years' War. Translated by C.S.V. Salt. New York: Dorset Press, 1978, 1990.

Marshall Cavendish Corporation.

- Escape from the Swastika. London: Marshall Cavendish Books, 1975.

McAvoy, George E.

- A Citizen-Soldier Remembers, 1942–1946: 149th Armored Signal Company of the 9th Armored Division. Littleton, New Hamspire, Crawford Press, 1991.

McCombs, Don, and Fred L. Worth.

- World War II: 4,139 Strange and Fascinating Facts. New York: Wing Books, 1983.

Melton, H. Keith.

- The Ultimate Spy Book. New York: DK Publishing, 1996.

Mills, John.

- Up in the Clouds, Gentlemen Please. New York: Ticknor & Fields, 1981.

Nafziger, George.

- Lutzen & Bautzen: Napoleon's Spring Campaign of 1813. Chicago, Illinois: Emperor's Press, 1992.

--.

- Napoleon at Leipzig: The Battle of Nations, 1813. Chicago, Illinois: Emperor's Press, 1996.

"Official Reports from the Camps: Oflag IVC, Colditz".

- The Prisoner of War: The Official Journal of the Prisoner of War Department of the Red Cross and St. John War Organization, St. James Palace, London S.W.1., Volume 3, Number 35 (March, 1945), pp. 10.

Petre, F. Loraine.

- Napoleon's Last Campaign in Germany, 1813. New York: John Lane Company, 1962.

Rabb, Theodore K.

- Renaissance Lives: Portraits of an Age. New York: Pantheon Books, 1993. [Chapter on Jan Hus]

Ramsden, John.

- "Refocusing 'the People's War': British War Films of the 1950s". Journal of Contemporary History, Volume 33, Number 1 (January 1998), pp. ?

Schumann, Robert.

- [Many of the numerous books about Robert and Clara Schumann]

Shoemaker, Lloyd R.

- The Escape Factory: The Story of MIS-X. New York: St. Martin's Press, 1990.
