= Colditz (disambiguation) =

Colditz is a city in Saxony, Germany.

Colditz may also refer to:

- Colditz Castle
- Oflag IV-C, World War II prisoner-of-war camp that operated in Colditz Castle

== Arts, entertainment, and media ==
- Colditz, 1962 Hodder & Stoughton omnibus by Pat Reid
- Colditz: The Full Story, 1984 book by Pat Reid
- The Colditz Story, a 1955 British film
- Colditz: Escape of the Birdmen, a 1971 television film
- Colditz (1972 TV series), a 1972–74 BBC television series
- Colditz (2005 TV series), a two-part television miniseries
- Colditz (audio drama), a 2001 audio drama episode in Doctor Who: The Monthly Adventures

== People ==
- David Colditz, American musician
- Graham Colditz, Australian chronic disease epidemiologist

== Other uses ==
- Colditz Cock, glider for prison escape

== See also ==
- Bibliography of Colditz Castle
- Kolditz, a German surname
