= Kolditz =

Kolditz is a German surname. Notable people with the surname include:

- Gottfried Kolditz (1922–1982), German film actor and director
- Lothar Kolditz (1929–2025), German chemist and politician
- Thomas Kolditz (born 1956), American retired Brigadier General, and academic

== See also ==
- Albert of Koldice (died 1448), a Bohemian nobleman
- Colditz (disambiguation)
