= Brian Degas =

English writer, producer, and merchandiser (1935–2020)

- Born: 2 October 1935; Buenos Aires, Argentina
- Died: 3 April 2020 (aged 84); Broadstairs, Kent, England
- Occupations: Merchandiser; producer; screenwriter; creative packager
- Spouse: Maggie Clews
- Children: 2, including Rupert Degas

Brian R. Degas (2 October 1935 – 3 April 2020) was an English producer and writer, merchandiser, and creative packager of ancillary rights.

== Early career ==
Degas was born to English parents on 2 October 1935 in Buenos Aires, Argentina. As a youth, he worked as a writer and director in amateur productions.

At the age of 21, he took a job in the United States at the CBS network as a production trainee in public affairs programming. He later worked with Charles Collingwood on the documentaries Adventure and Odyssey. In 1957, John Houseman invited Degas to work on his TV anthology series The Seven Lively Arts for CBS. During this period, Degas also worked with Reginald Rose, Sidney Lumet and George Roy Hill. At the age of 27, Degas was appointed Executive Producer of Light Entertainment and a member of the programming board for a new CBS affiliate.

After a meeting with Roger Moore, Degas received the opportunity to write several episodes of the television series The Saint. He also wrote episodes of The Baron and Strange Report for ITC Entertainment, Shirley's World for the American Broadcasting Company, and The Informer and The Mask of Janus for the BBC.

In 1963, Degas started creating and developing his own television series with BBC Television. He created and wrote three episodes for the series Vendetta. Degas also authored three paperbacks as spinoffs from the series and commissioned the series music from composer John Barry.

A fluent Italian speaker, Degas also started collaborating with Dino de Laurentiis on design, script consulting and editing for the films Barbarella, Danger Diabolik, Better a Widow and Summertime Killer. In 1975, after finishing these projects, Degas served as producer of The Venturers, a drama series for BBC TV concerning the world of high finance.

== Colditz ==
Degas co-created the television series Colditz, a BBC TV/MCA Universal co-production in 1972. It was a Second World War drama series based on the film The Colditz Story and the book The Latter Days by Major Patrick Robert Reid. During its run, Colditz was named Best BBC TV Series, Best British TV Series, Best Design, and Best Music. It had a record viewing audience of 18 million in the United Kingdom each week and was screened in 47 countries.

Using the intellectual property of Colditz, Degas pioneered the exploitation of television and film ancillary rights. He conceived, developed and licensed the following merchandising projects

- The Spirit of Colditz, a model of the Colditz glider for Airfix
- Colditz Breakpoint, a dramatic journey into the sounds of pursuit, capture and escape from Colditz released on an LP by EMI
- The Colditz Escape Kit, a DIY model of Colditz Castle
- an Action Man model
- endorsements for a Mars bar promotion that culminated in the board-game Escape from Colditz

Degas conceived and developed Escape from Colditz jointly with Major P. R. Reid. The game sold over half a million copies, including a Spanish version.

== Freelance career ==
Degas returned to the US and to television programming in New York and Hollywood for a brief period, which included being Head of Development for Brut Productions and for Danny Thomas Enterprises. With high hopes, he turned to the world of theatre and co-produced Chapter 17 by Simon Gray, which was a dismal failure at the box office. A romantic relationship with the legendary Gloria Swanson led to their collaboration on the writing of her long-awaited biography. Accordingly, in 1979, Degas set up Gloria's Way Inc and personally closed a publishing contract with Random House. The 520-page volume sold over 148,000 in hard cover and close to 300,000 in paperback, and was critically acclaimed in all three language editions. His distinctive marketing plan for the book and his promotional tour with Gloria refined his marketing skills in all aspects of the media.

Returning to the UK, he joined Polymuse Inc., an international film investment company, as executive vice-president in charge of Creative Affairs and Marketing emphasising that "in an advertising led system in a new billion dollar market in Europe it was time to develop a competitive strategy and target specific audiences on a cost effective bases – and that it was a fallacy to think that inexpensive programmes meant inferior TV".

In 1990, together with Harry Robertson he brought his innovative skills back to the BBC as creator, writer and producer of Specials, a television drama series, including three paperback editions published by Fontana, about part-time policemen – ordinary people whose commitment made them extraordinary. This was followed by Virtual Murder, an off-beat psychological 'whodunit' drama series about two jet-set investigative psychologists involved in bizarre crimes. The series' guest stars included Richard Todd, Dora Bryan and Jon Pertwee.

A later project was Confidentially Speaking, created in association with British Telecom, and written as an "eavesdropping drama" down a crossed telephone line.

Degas later took an extended sabbatical, and travelled the globe. He became a committed Sinophile and turned to publishing and ancillary rights sales.
