= Virtual Murder (TV series) =

BBC 1992 off-beat investigative drama series

- Kim Thomson as Samantha Valentine and Nicholas Clay as Dr. John Cornelius in Virtual Murder
- Created by: Harry Robertson and Brian Degas
- Starring: Nicholas Clay; Kim Thomson; Stephen Yardley; Jude Akuwudike; Alan David; Carole Boyd
- Theme music composer: Harry Robertson
- Country of origin: United Kingdom
- Original language: English
- No. of episodes: 6

Production
- Executive producer: Barry Hanson
- Producers: Harry Robertson and Brian Degas
- Running time: c. 50 minutes per episode

Original release
- Network: BBC1
- Release: 24 July – 28 August 1992

Virtual Murder is an investigative drama series shown on BBC television in 1992. It starred Nicholas Clay as Dr John Cornelius, a psychology lecturer at a provincial university, and Kim Thomson as his partner, Samantha Valentine.

== Subject matter and cast ==
Virtual Murder was in the mould of some earlier off-beat series, such as The Avengers and Adam Adamant Lives!, both shown in the 1960s. Like Steed and Emma Peel or Adam Adamant and Georgina Jones, Cornelius ("JC") and Valentine investigated a succession of rather eccentric or bizarre occurrences. They often did so in cooperation with the police, represented by Stephen Yardley as Inspector Cadogan and Jude Akuwudike as Sergeant Gummer. Complementing the occult elements and those of virtual reality, there was a thread of playful, sometimes dark humour running through the scripts and an underlying sexual frisson between Clay and Thomson.

Other regular characters were Professor Owen Griffiths (Alan David) and Phoebe Littlejohn (Carole Boyd, best known for her role as Lynda Snell in BBC radio's The Archers).

== Production ==
The series was created and produced at the BBC's Pebble Mill studios in Birmingham by Brian Degas, a scriptwriter for the film Barbarella (1968) and co-creator of the TV series Colditz (1972), and Harry Robertson, who is best known as a composer of film music (mostly under the name of Harry Robinson). The original title of the series was Nimrod, but this was changed to Virtual Murder, the original title of the script for what was intended to be the first episode, later renamed as "Dreams Imagic". As things turned out, "Dreams Imagic" was, in fact, the last episode to be broadcast. Direction of the episodes was shared between Philip Draycott and Peter Rose with the six episodes recorded between 12 August 1991 and 28 February 1992 at Studio A in Pebble Mill and on location in Birmingham, Milton Keynes, Kidderminster, and Wolverhampton. All apart from "Dreams Imagic" had an array of guest stars.

== Episodes ==
Six episodes of Virtual Murder were made and broadcast by the BBC on Friday evenings in 1992:

- Meltdown to Murder (broadcast 24 July 1992 at 9:32pm): script: Philip Martin; director: Philip Draycott; guest stars: Helen Lederer, Bernard Bresslaw, Julia Foster

Valuable paintings in art galleries are melting spontaneously, with no evident cause. Cornelius assists the police investigation, and a criminal and his motive are discovered.

- Last Train to Hell and Back (broadcast 31 July 1992 at 9:48pm): script: Barry Smith; director: Philip Draycott; guest stars: Richard Todd, Anita Carey, Colin McFarlane

Dramatic goings-on on the Empire Steam Preservation Railway, filmed on the Severn Valley Railway. The opening titles feature the locomotive 6960 Raveningham Hall running at night. In another night-time scene, filmed at Kidderminster, a victim of the villain is about to be run over by a train but escapes in the nick of time.

- A Bone to Pick (broadcast 7 August 1992 at 9:47pm): script: Tom Needham; director: Peter Rose; guest stars: Tony Robinson, Hywel Bennett, Debbie Arnold, Richard Coleman
- A Torch for Silverado (broadcast 14 August 1992 at 9:33pm): script: Tim Aspinall; director: Peter Rose; guest stars: Jon Pertwee, Bernard Horsfall, John Bluthal, Paddie O'Neil, Ozzie Yue, Choy-Ling Man
- A Dream of Dracula (broadcast 21 August 1992 at 9:35pm): script: Bennett Byron Sims; director: Philip Draycott; guest stars: Julian Clary, Ronald Fraser, Jill Gascoine, Alfred Marks, Peggy Mount
- Dreams Imagic (broadcast 28 August 1992 at 9:32pm): script: Harry Robertson; director: Peter Rose; guest stars: Sean Pertwee, Tim Preece, Mark Caven, Sarah Lam, Patricia O'Toole as Pat O'Toole

== Critical reaction ==
On the whole, the series received a lukewarm critical response with Lynne Truss in The Times summing it up as "The Avengers re-written by someone who heard about it once but never actually saw it". Another commentator, who, on balance, judged the series a failure, described it as being pitched "uncomfortabl[y] somewhere between the camp of The Avengers and the dark fantasy of The X-Files", although the latter highly acclaimed American science fiction series post-dates Virtual Murder by over a year. Others have blamed the summer evening scheduling for jeopardising its chances of success.

Ratings fell from 6.53 million for the opening episode to 4.9 million for the fourth episode and the series was not renewed for a second season. Virtual Murder is well regarded in some quarters: for example, the eminent television historian Andrew Pixley, recalling the show in 2002, wrote, "Finally, I thought, somebody had been brave enough to craft a modern thriller which, while captured on videotape, boasted all the style, fun and imagination of the great British film series of the 1960s such as The Avengers and Department S". However, the series remains largely forgotten today and, as of 2026, has never been repeated, nor released in any video or DVD format.
