= Arsène Marie Paul Vauthier =

Arsène Marie Paul Vauthier (1885-1979) was a French Major General. He was imprisoned in Colditz from 19 January 1945.
