= Florimond Duke =

American football player (1895–1969)

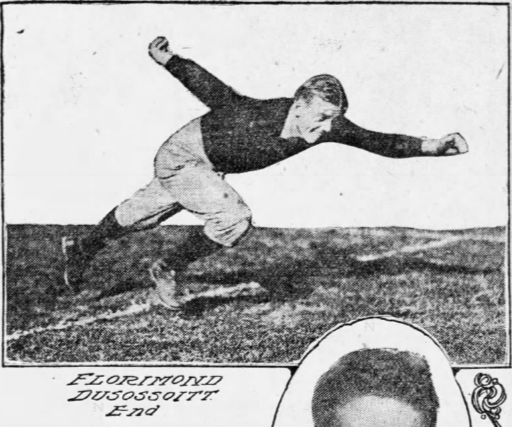

Profile
- Position: End

Personal information
- Born: October 2, 1895; Rochester, New York, U.S.
- Died: April 4, 1969 (aged 73); Phoenix, Arizona, U.S.
- Listed height: 5 ft 11 in (1.80 m)
- Listed weight: 185 lb (84 kg)

Career information
- High school: Brookline (MA)
- College: Dartmouth

Career history
- New York Giants (1921); Tonawanda Kardex (1921)

Career statistics
- NFL games played: 2
- NFL games started: 2
- Stats at Pro Football Reference

Florimond DuSossoit Duke (October 2, 1895 – April 4, 1969), previously known as Florimond Joseph DuSossoit, was an American football player, magazine executive, and Army officer. He is best known for his 1944 mission parachuting into Hungary as an officer in the Office of Strategic Services (OSS).

== Early life ==
Duke was born in Rochester, New York, in 1895, as Florimond Joseph DuSossoit. He attended Brookline High School in Massachusetts. He attended Dartmouth College where he played college football in 1915 and 1916.

During World War I, Duke was an ambulance driver with the American Field Service. He later became a pilot with the Signal Corps.

Duke played professional football in 1921 with the New York Giants of the National Football League.

== Magazine executive and OSS service ==
Duke worked for many years as an executive for Time, Fortune, Life, and Newsweek magazines. He was hired by Time in 1924 and served as the advertising manager for Fortune from 1929 to 1935. From 1935 to 1937, he was vice president of Newsweek. He later became advertising manager of Life and then Time.

In 1939, Duke joined the U.S. Army. He served as a military attache in South Africa and Egypt and later became the head of the Balkan desk at the Office of Strategic Services (OSS). Shortly before the 1944 German invasion of Hungary, he parachuted into the country to engage in peace negotiations with the Hungarians. When Germany invaded, Duke was captured and held in German prisons for 13 months. He served as Senior American Officer of prisoners at Oflag IV-C, Colditz Castle, cooperating with Senior British Officer Willie Tod. Duke was freed from Colditz in April 1945.

== Later life ==
After the war, he became a partner in the advertising firm of Day, Duke and Tarleton.

Duke moved to Scottsdale, Arizona, in 1961. He died in Phoenix of a heart attack in 1969 at age 73.
