= Better a Widow =

- Italian film poster
- Directed by: Duccio Tessari
- Screenplay by: Adriano Baracco; Ennio De Concini; Brian Degas; Tudor Gates; Duccio Tessari
- Story by: Ennio De Concini
- Produced by: Turi Vasile
- Starring: Virna Lisi; Peter McEnery; Gabriele Ferzetti; Jean Servais; Nino Terzo; Lando Buzzanca
- Cinematography: Ennio Guarnieri
- Edited by: Mario Morra
- Music by: Carlo Rustichelli
- Production companies: Ultra Film; Universal Productions France
- Distributed by: Universal Pictures
- Release date: 9 October 1968 (Italy)
- Running time: 105 minutes
- Countries: Italy; France
- Language: Italian

Better a Widow (Italian: Meglio vedova) is a 1968 Italian comedy film. It stars actor Gabriele Ferzetti.

== Cast ==
- Virna Lisi: Rosa Minniti
- Peter McEnery: Tom Proby
- Gabriele Ferzetti: don Calogero Minniti
- Jean Servais: Baron Misceni
- Lando Buzzanca: Massito
- Agnès Spaak: prostitute
- Nino Terzo: Carmelo
- Carla Calò: governante di Rosa
- Roy Bosier: direttore d'orchestra
- Bruno Lauzi: direttore d'albergo

== Reception ==
"Werb." of Variety found the film to be a "modest imitation" of American styled romantic adventure films, noting "fine photography, sets, costuming and music" but that "screenplay is one of the major flaws but it is difficult to determine whether vet Italo writer Ennio De Concini and director Duccio Tessari are responsible or whether fault is with collaborators Brian Degas and Tudor Gates."
