= Escape from Colditz =

Board game published in 1973

- Gibsons Games 1st edition box cover, 1973
- Genres: Strategy
- Players: 2–6
- Setup time: 10 minutes
- Playing time: 90 mins to three hours
- Chance: Dice rolls
- Skills: Strategic Planning

Escape from Colditz is a board game produced by Gibsons Games of London in 1973 that simulates attempted escapes by Allied prisoners-of-war (POWs) from Oflag IV-C (better known as Colditz Castle) during World War II. Designed in part by Pat Reid, a former POW who escaped from Colditz, the game was released during the first run of the popular television series Colditz, and the game likewise proved popular. Licensed editions were published by Parker Brothers and a number of other companies. The game proved especially popular in Spain, and resulted in a Spanish-language sequel.

Gibsons Games 2nd edition. The swastika has been replaced by an eagle

== Description ==
Escape from Colditz is a board game for 2–6 players in which one player takes on the role of the German security officer at Colditz, and the other players represent the various nationalities of POWs being held there who are trying to find the means to escape.

=== Components ===
The game box contains:

- The game board, covered with a grid of linked circles, is a pictorial plan of Colditz Castle showing the inner and outer courtyards, various rooms, safe areas, cells, and barracks.
- Five sets of eight tokens representing five nationalities of POWs.
- One set of sixteen black tokens representing the German guards.
- Five "Personal Escape Kit" cards
- Five "Do or Die" cards
- 27 "Escape Equipment" cards
- 45 "Escape Opportunity" cards
- 14 "Security Opportunity" cards
- rules sheet
- two six-sided dice
- historical account of the castle's role as a POW camp during World War II

=== Set up ===
- One player agrees to be the German Security Officer, and places some of the black tokens on designated spots on the board, and the rest in the barracks. The other players are Escape Officers; each chooses one of the nationalities of POWs and places their tokens on indicated spots on the Parade Ground in the inner courtyard. (The number of guards and POWs will vary according to the number of players.)
- A "Do or Die" card is dealt facedown to each Escape Officer. This card remains facedown and unknown to all until played.
- A time limit is agreed to by all players, as well as the number of successful escapes required for victory.

=== Gameplay ===
The first active player is the one sitting to the left of the German Security Officer. Play continues around the table to the left, with the Security Officer always moving last.

==== Movement ====
The active player rolls two dice and can move any or all of their POWs, the total movement of the POWs equaling the total on the dice. If the player rolls doubles, they can roll again and add the second roll to their movement total. If the player rolls a 3, 7 or 11, the player takes an "Escape Opportunity" card (Escape Officer) or "Security Opportunity" card (Security Officer).

==== Obtain personal escape kit ====
First, Escape Officers must obtain the four elements that make up a Personal Escape Kit: food, disguises, maps, and a compass. Symbols representing these are scattered around the castle in various rooms. An Escape Officer must maneuver POWs so that they are simultaneously in four rooms containing the four different symbols. Once this is accomplished, the Escape Officer receives a "personal Escape Kit" card. The guards at this point do not have the power of arrest, so can only block doorways in an attempt to slow down the POWs.

==== Obtain escape equipment ====
Each different escape route requires specific pieces of escape equipment. Once an Escape Officer has a Personal Escape Kit, and has decided on a route, they must attempt to pick up the required pieces of equipment, by either moving two POWs into a room with the symbol of the desired piece of equipment, or moving two POWs into two different rooms containing the same symbol. Escape Officers can also obtain desired equipment by trading Equipment cards with other Escape Officers. If a guard sees a POW entering or exiting a forbidden room, a guard can arrest the POW by moving a guard into the same circle as the POW. Likewise, a POW can voluntarily offer themselves up for arrest. The POW is sent to the cells for solitary confinement, while the guard immediately returns to the barracks. If the arrest happens in the outer courtyard, the Escape Officer must forfeit an Equipment card. The POW in the cells is released if the Escape Officer rolls doubles, or plays an appropriate Opportunity card.

Cover of Dutch edition, titled Colditz

==== Attempted escape ====
Once the Escape officer has obtained the proper equipment, one of their POWs can attempt to escape. As each piece of equipment is used in the attempt, the Equipment card is returned to the deck. Once the POW has made it past the castle wall, the POW attempts to get to one of the target areas on the edge of the board as quickly as possible. If the POW successfully reaches a target area without being arrested or shot, the POW is deemed to have escaped.

==== Do or die ====
As a last resort, an Escape Officer may elect to use the "Do or Die" card, which allows for one escape attempt without the need for any Equipment. Turning over the "Do or Die" card reveals a number between 3 and 7. This is how many dice rolls the player is allowed to make in attempting to move one chosen POW towards a target area. The player rolls the dice the number of times indicated (rolling again if doubles are rolled). If the total of all rolls equals or exceeds the amount of movement the chosen POW needs to reach a target area, the POW successfully escapes. If the amount of movement generated is not enough for the POW to reach a target area, the escape attempt fails and that player is out of the game.

=== Victory conditions ===
If any player reaches the agreed-to number of successful escapes, the game is over and that player is the winner. If the time limit is reached before any player has made the required number of escapes, the German Security Officer player is the winner.

== Tactics ==
In the book The Games & Puzzles Book of Modern Board Games, John Humphries suggests that since the German Security Officer wins if the POWs run out of time, it is important to try to delay the POW escape plans by deploying the guards efficiently, watching doors to prevent POWs from entering rooms to gain equipment, especially those doors that gain access to more than one room. Arresting as many prisoners as possible after they have filched equipment puts them in solitary confinement for a period of time, reducing the POWs available to the Escape Officers. Humphries also suggests keeping a written tally of the equipment owned by each Escape Officer to try to analyze which escape route is being contemplated.

For the Escape Officers, Humphries suggests that obtaining their Personal Escape Kit card as soon as possible is essential. He also suggests collecting more escape equipment than is necessary, rather than trying to make do with just enough equipment. Avoiding guards (and subsequent arrest) is essential, but sometimes sending a POW to deliberately get arrested is necessary, since the guard is returned to the barracks after taking the prisoner to the cells, potentially leaving a door unguarded for a second POW to move through. Finally, Humphries suggests that the Escape Officer design several phony escapes as diversions to occupy the guards before unveiling the actual escape plan. Humphries's concluding words of advice are, "first, keep on the move and second, plan escape attempts carefully."

Spanish edition Fuga de Colditz

== Publication history ==
In 1972, BBC produced Colditz, a television series about Allied POWs imprisoned at the supposedly escape-proof Colditz Castle and their many attempts to escape. The TV series proved popular in the UK, and former Colditz POW and escapee Major Pat Reid, who had written several books about his wartime experiences, co-designed a board game with Bob Brechin and Brian Degas as an official licensed tie-in to the TV series. The game, Escape from Colditz, was published in the UK by Gibsons Games in 1973. It was also published in North America by Parker Brothers the same year. The original box of both these editions featured a swastika; in later editions, this was replaced by an Reichsadler (Imperial eagle). The game proved to be very popular.

A Spanish edition, Fuga de Colditz, sold very well in Spain, and Major Reid designed a sequel, Después de Colditz (After Colditz), in which the POWs who escaped from Colditz try to make their way to Switzerland, Spain, Sweden or England.

A new edition of the board game, with new artwork and updated rules, was released in October 2016 by Osprey Games.

In 1972, Invicta Plastics published an unrelated board game designed by 18-year-old Adrian Wild titled Escape from Colditz Castle. Although that game proved popular, selling 130,000 copies, it was quickly forgotten once Escape from Colditz was released by Gibsons Games the following year.

== Video game adaptation ==
An Amiga computer game titled Escape from Colditz was created in 1990 by Digital Magic Software. Based on the board game, it required the player to help four prisoners escape by exploring the castle, finding equipment, solving puzzles and digging a tunnel.

Colditz Escape!, an open source game engine recreation of the 1990 Amiga game, was created by Aperture Software in 2009. The engine is available for Microsoft Windows, Linux, MacOS and PlayStation Portable.

== Reception ==
In Issue 29 of Games & Puzzles, John Humphries thought the board was "well designed". He noted that "as the game progresses and escape plans near fruition, it can become quite tense for the players concerned, hoping that they will not be caught at the last minute." However, Humphries found that "the rules are atrociously compiled, full of errors, omissions and anomalies." Despite this, he gave the game a rating of 4 out of 6, saying, "Escape from Colditz should provide many hours of enjoyment for most members of the family."

In the book Achtung Schweinhund!: A Boy's Own Story of Imaginary Combat, journalist Harry Pearson noted the one problem he had with the game: "Escape from Colditz was hugely popular, but it had one major defect — someone had to be the Germans. While the Allied players got to run around the castle hoping to nick the stall car, collecting skeleton keys and wire cutters and hoarding Red Cross cigarettes with which to bribe the guards, the German player just marched around with his dogs hoping to fall into a tunnel."

In The Games & Puzzles Book of Modern Board Games, John Humphries said the game "should be played for fun and in fact can be very amusing as well as frustrating and tense at times. Tension can certainly be created when an escape attempt is 'on', and hunter and hunted are both in full cry." He concluded, "The game does not and could not recreate the sense of hopelessness and deprivation experienced by most prisoners of war, but in fairness does not claim to be a true simulation of the actual period, emphasising rather the spirit of co-operation between prisoners."

== Other reviews and commentary ==
- The Gamer #2 (September-October 1981)
- Games & Puzzles #50
