= Louis Buisson =

French general (1889–1955)

Louis Buisson (14 December 1889 – 5 December 1955) was a French Major General. During the battle of France, he was the commander of the 3rd Armored Division from 15 May 1940 and later took command of a battle group comprising the 3rd Armored Division, the 7th Light Mechanized Division and the 10th Polish Armored Brigade. He was imprisoned in Colditz from 19 January 1945. He survived the war and died in 1955.

He first joined the 22nd BCA (Alpine chasseurs Batalion) as a rank-and-file, where he rose as a corporal then sergent. Sous-lieutenant (2nd Lieutenant) in the reserve of the 13th BCA part of 6th GCC in 1914, he is wounded on 15.11.1914 at Perthes-les-Hurlu. He rose as a lieutenant on 01.04.1915, Captain in october 1917. He majored N°1 from l’Ecole de Guerre (war college), he is then promoted to Chef de Bataillon (major) as an exceptional reward in 1928 in the 99th RIA (Alpine infantry regiment). Colonel in the 503rd RCC (Régiment de Chars de Combat) in 1938, he is then assigned to 3rd DIM (Division d’Infanterie Motorisée) in 1939. By 1940, he is the commanding officer of the 3rd DCR (Division Cuirassée) and is made a general.

He is then a Prisoner of War, during 5 years of captivity, with the last year spent in the Colditz fortress.

During his captivity, général BUISSON will be detained in several OFLAG. He is sentenced to the death penalty by the nazi on 16 January 1945; he is saved by the arrival of the american troops on 16 April 1945.

In 1945, he is appointed director of the service in charge of the Axis troops PoWs.

Army general (Général d’Armée) Buisson, Grand Croix de la Légion d’Honneur, died in Paris on 05.12.1955

rest place in Bourget-du-Lac

place named after Général Buisson in Bourget-du-Lac : https://www.gralon.net/plan-ville/planr-place-general-buisson-le-bourget-du-lac-1557700.htm

Distinction : https://www.leonore.archives-nationales.culture.gouv.fr/ui/notice/60133
