= Giles Romilly =

British journalist

Giles Samuel Bertram Romilly (19 September 1916 – 2 August 1967) was a British communist journalist, Second World War POW, brother of Esmond Romilly, and nephew of Winston Churchill through his wife Clementine Churchill.

== Biography ==
Romilly was educated at Wellington College and Oxford University, and then served as a war correspondent in both the Spanish Civil War and the Second World War. He was captured in May 1940 in the Norwegian town of Narvik while reporting for the Daily Express.

Romilly was the first German prisoner to be classified as Prominente, prisoners regarded by Adolf Hitler to be of great value due to their relationships to prominent Allied political figures. Because of his importance to Hitler, Romilly was imprisoned in Oflag IV-C (Colditz Castle), from where escape was perceived to be almost impossible. Romilly lived in relative comfort with the other Prominente who would later join him at Colditz, although they were all watched 24 hours a day in case they should attempt to escape.

Romilly used this position to his advantage and caused trouble by issuing complaints for every conceivable annoyance. Amongst the list, he took offence to the noise created by the boots of his guard outside his door, preventing him from sleeping. Following a visit from the Red Cross, a red carpet was placed outside his door to dull the sound.

Romilly did successfully escape however, whilst the Prominente were being moved to "Oflag VII-D" Tittmoning Castle in April 1945. The camp was home to some Dutch officers amongst whom was captain Machiel van den Heuvel, "Vandy". Romilly and Vandy knew each other from their time at Colditz, where Vandy was the Dutch escape officer. Vandy was transferred to Tittmoning because of his leading role as an escape officer, and the Germans thought he could do no more harm in Tittmoning, where most prisoners were older officers of general rank. Vandy, however had his next escape plan ready, and together with two Dutch officers, Romilly abseiled down the castle walls. The rest of the Prominente tried to hide in the castle to make it look like they had all escaped. After four days, they were all discovered. Even though 3,000 people were looking for Romilly, he was able to reach the Allied lines.

This was due mainly to the gallant action of lieutenant Andre Tieleman, a Dutch officer who was fluent in German and French. With their false identity papers identifying them as French (forced) labourers they managed to escape. When interrogated by German officials, Lt Tieleman did the talking while Romilly pretended to be deaf and dumb. In this way they managed to escape into freedom.

After the war Romilly returned to journalism. In 1952 he wrote the memoir The Privileged Nightmare, later reissued as Hostages at Colditz, with fellow Prominente Michael Alexander, who had earned the status by falsely claiming to be a relative of Field Marshal Harold Alexander. Romilly died in Berkeley, California in 1967 of a tranquilliser overdose. His wife Coral Romilly also ingested the sedatives but survived. He was in the process of researching a book on the American novel at the time.
