= Colditz (1972 TV series) =

British television drama series (1972–1974)

- Colditz's title card
- Genre: War drama Period drama
- Created by: Brian Degas; Gerard Glaister
- Starring: Jack Hedley; Robert Wagner; David McCallum; Bernard Hepton; Edward Hardwicke; Anthony Valentine
- Country of origin: United Kingdom
- No. of series: 2
- No. of episodes: 28

Production
- Running time: 1 Hour

Original release
- Network: BBC1
- Release: 19 October 1972 – 1 April 1974

Colditz is a British television drama series co-produced by the BBC and Universal Studios and screened between 1972 and 1974.

The series deals with Allied prisoners of war imprisoned at the supposedly escape-proof Colditz Castle when designated Oflag IV-C during World War II, and their many attempts to escape captivity, as well as the relationships formed between the various nationalities and their German captors.

== Production ==
Colditz was created by Brian Degas working with the producer Gerard Glaister, who went on to devise another successful BBC series dealing with the Second World War, Secret Army. Technical consultant for the series was Major Pat Reid, the real British Escape Officer at Colditz. Locations used in filming include Stirling Castle and Calver Mill, Derbyshire.

== Characters ==
=== British ===
- Lieutenant Colonel John Preston DSO TD (Jack Hedley) – Senior British Officer, Colonel Preston is the embodiment of the British stiff upper lip. He is mostly emotionless, intelligent, respected by his troops, and normally rigid in his application of principles. He gets along quite well with the Kommandant, whom he respects and is adept in negotiating with. His only real sources of passion are recollections of his time in the trenches in World War I, and his wife Caroline, whom he married late and had to leave behind to go to war. During the first season he is awarded the Distinguished Service Order for his actions at Dunkirk.
- Captain Pat Grant (Edward Hardwicke) – Captain Grant is the first person appointed as British escape officer in Colditz. He is mild-mannered and mostly level-headed. He often serves as an arbiter between his fellow officers' passion and enthusiasm and Colonel Preston's clinical calmness. The fictional Grant resembles Pat Reid, former POW who was the technical advisor for the series.
- Flight Lieutenant Simon Carter (David McCallum) – Flight Lieutenant Carter is a pugnacious young RAF officer who enjoys baiting the German guards and is very impatient to escape. He misses his young wife Cathy very much and seeks to return to her. He frequently finds himself in solitary confinement. In the second season, he mellows somewhat as he accepts the post of escape officer and is tempered by that responsibility. The fictional Carter resembles the real Colditz inmate Flight Lieutenant Dominic Bruce OBE MC AFM KSG MA, the legendary 'Medium Sized Man' from IX Squadron, who was sent to Colditz after escaping from Castle Spangenberg. Bruce achieved one of the most celebrated of all escapes from Colditz, the so-called 'Tea Chest' escape, a replica of which was featured in the Imperial War Museum's 'Great Escapes' exhibition.
- Captain Tim Downing (Richard Heffer) – Captain Downing is generally the devil's advocate of the group. While he seems to be the most pessimistic of the British contingent, his criticisms are often insightful and valid. His character most closely resembles that of the Public School "Officer Class" stereotype. He is ambitious, views himself as the second-in-command, and seeks the post of escape officer. He is often at odds with Colonel Preston, whom he challenges quite frequently. He rarely participates in escape attempts himself but provides reliable support for escapees. Downing is portrayed with a handlebar moustache.
- Captain George Brent (Paul Chapman) – Captain Brent is the most nervous and least confident of the officers but is capable of having brilliant ideas. He is unfortunately known for the number of times he has bungled escapes or ruined others' chances at escape. He has insomnia, and often worries about the future, generally having a pessimistic outlook on his captivity. However, he has occasionally been extraordinarily brave, such as in the episode "Ghosts" where he remained holed up in dreadful conditions, voluntarily, for several weeks. An accomplished artist, Brent uses his skill to sketch a likeness of a refuse collector in the episode "Court Martial" in order to aid and abet an escape attempt by Flight Lieutenant Carrington. He has a weakness for gambling, and at one time lost his house, the home of his infirm father, having involved himself in a card school with a notorious card sharp, Flight Lieutenant Collins. Brent is usually portrayed wearing a cricket sweater like the real life Rupert Barry.
- Lieutenant Dick Player RN (Christopher Neame) – Lieutenant Player is a quiet but determined officer from the Royal Navy. His perfect German and history of living in Germany cause the Germans to suspect at first that he is a spy, which causes him a great deal of trouble. Once in Colditz, though, he is a keen and cool escaper, and participates in some of the most daring and fantastic escape attempts of the series.
- Pilot Officer Peter Muir (Peter Penry-Jones) – P.O. Muir is a rash officer who has a reputation for not "looking before he leaps". Nevertheless, he is a keen member of the escape team. He formed part of Pat Grant's escape team, but was wounded by a gunshot when he and Player were recaptured.
- Lieutenant Jordan (Padre) (Donald McDonald) – The Padre is a mild-mannered officer who, in his own words, does "not exactly summon a multitude" with his tedious sermons. His profession unfortunately often conflicts with his duty to the war effort, and so Colonel Preston generally keeps him out of any escape plans. At one point he protests against this with a quotation from 1 Corinthians, "When I became a man I put away childish things". Patrick Troughton played "Padre" in one episode of the first season.
- Doc (Geoffrey Palmer) – The Doc is featured in three episodes, most prominently in "Tweedledum". He is frustrated by the lack of medicines and views the German village doctor as a quack.
- Wing Commander George Marsh (Michael Bryant) – A medical orderly and assistant to the British Medical Officer, Marsh is the officer who feigned insanity to achieve repatriation.
- Lieutenant Page (Ian McCulloch) – Lieutenant Page is an antisocial and violent late addition to the British contingent, who appears to have little knowledge of the air force, despite claiming to be an RAF officer. Page is not his real name as he took the identity of the Lysander pilot who was killed while inserting him into France. This character is a British Secret agent on his thirteenth mission and is known to, and being hunted by, the Gestapo. Suffering from post-traumatic stress disorder he sees his identity change as a chance to escape the war and hide out in Colditz, the last place the Gestapo would look for him.
- Flying Officer Jimmy Walker (Peter Winter) – An RAF officer who suspects Lieutenant Page is a German spy, picks a fight with him and as a result ends up with injury to his eyes.
- Captain George Holland (David Allister) – A member of the escape committee who becomes unstable as he gives up hope from escaping the castle.
- Lance Corporal Baker (Alec Wallis) – Colonel Preston's batman, who has immense respect for his officer.
- Lieutenant Michael Brown (Sean Roantree)
- Captain Walters (Nicholas McArdle)
- Corporal Hopkins (Len Lowe)
- Squadron Leader Tony Shaw (Jeremy Kemp) – An aerial reconnaissance pilot and one of the most highly decorated men in the Allied Forces. In addition to which, according to Hauptmann Ulmann, Shaw is also the most decorated person in Colditz, apart from Major Mohn. An academic lecturer before the war, he becomes obsessed with his idea of an escape using a POW built glider. The real Colditz Cock glider was devised and built by RAF pilot, Bill Goldfinch with Jack Best as his partner in the construction.
- Major Trumpington (Willie Rushton) – A Scottish commando, captured with two companions during a raid on Boulogne. The German SD intend to implement Hitler's order that all commandos are to be shot. Despite the best efforts of Preston, the British escape committee and the Camp Kommandant, Major Trumpington and his two fellow commandos are taken away by the SD for execution but are shot while trying to escape. This episode mirrors the fate of the Operation Musketoon commandos who were briefly imprisoned in the solitary confinement cells at Colditz before being shot at Sachsenhausen. Flt Lt Bruce's conversation with the commando leader Capt Black is retold in "Operation Musketoon" by Stephen Schofield.
- Flight Lieutenant Jack Collins (Ray Barrett) – A late and disruptive arrival who introduces a card school into the British quarters. Captain George Brent joins the school and eventually loses very heavily. Owing £1000, Brent loses his house in a game of 'double or quit'. Collins attempts escape by playing cards with Unterfeldwebel Ernst Krueger, a German quartermaster, cheating to make Krueger lose heavily before bribing him for a workers identity disc. The escape attempt is foiled and Collins is moved out of Colditz but not before the Kommandant retrieves and returns all Brent's losses to Preston.
- Lieutenant McDonald (Prentis Hancock). McDonald is portrayed as having a working-class background unlike other officers. He is a Scottish commando who receives a letter from his wife informing him that she is pregnant by another man. He resolves to escape soon and after initial debating and resistance, is given a place on a French escape plan. He escapes the castle wall and encourages the French escapee to press on without him. Seemingly with a deathwish, McDonald is shot on the wire. The Kommandant reads unposted letters of McDonald's indicating McDonald indeed wanted to die in the escape. McDonald's character has some resemblances to the real life Michael Sinclair. McDonald has red hair as did Sinclair, who was nicknamed 'The Red Fox'. Sinclair was the only person killed while escaping from Colditz. However, the nature of Sinclair's fatal escape attempt was very different from that portrayed by McDonald.
- Lieutenant James Porteous (Jim Norton) – The Colditz librarian. Although having made two previous escape attempts whilst in transit, having been confined to Colditz Porteous becomes a somewhat staid and unenthusiastic escaper who appears to be happy to sit out the war. A schoolmaster before the war, Porteous strikes up a friendship with the (initially) reticent Sqn Ldr Tony Shaw.
- Cathy Carter (Joanna David) – While not an internee, Carter's wife plays a significant role in the series. Reluctant to let her new husband leave in the second episode, she is devastated to learn he has been shot down and worries that he has not survived. When she learns he is at a POW camp, she keeps in touch with him through letters. Good at crosswords and quick on the uptake, Cathy becomes embroiled in a scheme to connect escaping prisoners with the European underground. In this, she resembles Mary Lagan Bruce (the real-life wife of the 'Medium Sized Man' Dominic Bruce), who once sent her husband a silk escaping map (of Northern Germany) supplied to her by MI9 and concealed in the brass button of a uniform she sent him. This map was featured in the Imperial War Museum 'Great Escapes' exhibition and was subsequently donated to the museum of IX Squadron, RAF Marham, by their son, Brendan Bruce.

=== American ===
- Flight Lieutenant Phil Carrington (Robert Wagner) – Flight Lieutenant Carrington is an American officer who volunteered to serve with the Canadians early in the war. Like the real life Micky Burn, he served as a journalist in Berlin before the war and has an intimate knowledge of Germany and German politics and admits to having had some admiration for National Socialism. Carrington appears to be sensible at first, but he is a maverick, which gets him in trouble with the Germans and the British alike. Carrington becomes involved in an escape attempt with Pat Grant. In reality the officer who escaped with Reid via Hans Larive's Singen route was Canadian Howard Wardle. In later episodes, Carrington is shown to have switched his commission to the US Army Air Corps as a Major, and, in that role, is recaptured and sent to Colditz along with the three characters listed below.
- Lieutenant Jim Phipps (Garrick Hagon) – US prisoner of war who becomes the central element of an episode when the Germans categorise him as 'Prominente' on the basis of being the son of a US Ambassador. In reality Lieutenant John Winant Jr., was the son of John Gilbert Winant, US ambassador to Britain.
- Lieutenant Colonel Max Dodd (Dan O'Herlihy) – Old-school and brash, Colonel Dodd arrives with Major Carrington on his second trip to Colditz, and rapidly becomes the Senior American Officer of that growing contingent. He does not take well to being a prisoner, and often clashes with the Kommandant. Unlike his counterpart Colonel Preston, he is more than willing to take substantial risks with his men in order to accomplish his objectives. In reality the Colonel among the three paratroopers captured in Hungary and sent to Colditz was Colonel Florimund Duke – the oldest American paratrooper of the war.
- Captain Harry Nugent (Al Mancini) – arrives with Dodd and the return of Carrington. In reality the two real life paratroops arriving with Florimund Duke in August 1944 were Captain Guy Nunn, and Alfred Suarez.
- Lieutenant Colonel Harrity (Ed Bishop) – Commander of the American troops who liberate the castle in the final episode. He offers Preston the chance to get some "justice", but Preston will have none of it and insists on proper treatment for the Germans.

=== French ===
- Capitaine André Vaillant (Gerard Paquis) – Capitaine Vaillant is a stereotypical Frenchman who is characterised as self-serving, self-righteous, dashing, and a shameless womaniser.
- Capitaine Henri Lefevre (Henri Szeps)
- Capitaine Duprez (Guido Adorni)
- Lieutenant Maurice Tailière (Boyd Mackenzie)
- Lieutenant Beausire (Stuart Fell)

=== German ===
==== Oflag IV-C ====
- Kommandant (Bernard Hepton) – The Kommandant, known only by his forename "Karl", is a moderate and honourable Oberst (Colonel) of the Wehrmacht. He holds to the old Army ways of respecting enemy officers and adheres to the Geneva Convention to the best of his ability. He has difficulty believing that any authority but that of the OKW is legitimate, and often finds himself in dilemmas over orders he receives from the SS or Reich Security. Fortunately, he has an ally in General Schaetzel, a respected figure in the OKW. With the help of Schaetzel, and Colonel Preston's cooperation, he constantly works to prevent the SS from taking control of the camp. He finds it boring in the camp and cannot stand incompetence. When important visitors come round, he is usually embarrassed by one prisoner or another. He has a young son, Erich, in the Luftwaffe, and a wife named Lisa. He fears for his son's safety and hopes that he will not become bloodthirsty. He wishes that everything would run smoothly so that he can get on with his life, and that his son will return home. He is shaken and broken when he learns that his son died when crushed by a Russian tank.
- Hauptmann Franz Ulmann (Hans Meyer) – Hauptmann Ulmann is the Security Officer at Colditz. A calculating and rather robotic individual most of the time, he takes his job of preventing escapes seriously and is sometimes ill at ease with the Kommandant's lax attitude. He took over early from Oberleutnant Lehr, a young and easygoing officer who was drafted to the front lines, and was appalled at the lack of discipline among the security forces. Because of his careful planning and sharp eyes and mind, he is able to avert many escape attempts as well as many attempts of the SS to take over the camp. He seems to have been sent by the OKW specifically to help the Kommandant in these matters. While occasionally he comes up with a brilliant scheme, most of his captures are a result of thoroughness. He develops a warm relationship with Carrington over the course of the series. He believes there is no such thing as an escape-proof prison, but he plans to make security such that the prisoners will struggle anyway. Like the Kommandant, he is a Wehrmacht man who has no love of the SS. Ulmann is largely based on real life Reinhold Eggers who later wrote a book presenting the German side of the story. Eggers' book contains a foreword by a former Dutch POW, Damiaen Joan van Doorninck, who commented, "This man was our opponent, but nevertheless he earned our respect by his correct attitude, self-control and total lack of rancour despite all the harassment we gave him."
- Major Horst Mohn (Anthony Valentine) – Mohn is a character who joins at the start of the second series and is probably based on Major Amthor, the real-world second-in-command officer at Colditz from May 1943. A Luftwaffe paratrooper hero with the Knight's Cross of the Iron Cross with Oak Leaves (though the medal shown in the series is the Knight's Cross of the Iron Cross with Oak Leaves and Swords), and German Cross in Gold, Major Mohn was severely wounded at Stalingrad by a Russian bayonet and served on Hitler's personal staff before coming to Colditz. He is a Nazi Party member and very highly connected (although the series does not mention to whom). He constantly finds himself in conflict with the Kommandant, for his philosophy is that the war is still going on at Colditz and is frustrated by what he perceives as the treatment of prisoners with "kid gloves". The prisoners loathe him and do whatever they can to foil him or antagonise him at every turn. Unfortunately for them, he is ruthlessly intelligent and occasionally pulls off a devastating capture. Major Mohn's relationship with the SS appears to be fairly chilly. He is visibly upset with the SD orders given at the end of the episode "The Guests" and seems nervous around the Obergruppenführer and Hauptsturmführer in "Very Important Person." It appears that the reason why Major Mohn would prefer to take SS orders unquestioningly than risk SS reprisals is that he appreciates, apparently better than the Kommandant, what the SS is capable of. In contrast to the honourable Kommandant and Ulmann, Mohn is a sinister and villainous character.
- Oberleutnant Anton Lehr (Grahame Mallard) – Lieutenant Lehr is the first Security Officer of Colditz, but in the fourth episode is posted to the front. He is easygoing and cheerful most of the time, although he gets the job done with apparent competence. He is not upset at the posting and looks forward to fighting for his country. In reality Paul Priem was the first Security Officer. Pat Reid described Priem as "the only German with a sense of humour".
- Major Willi Schaeffer (Michael Gough) – Major Schaeffer is second in command and a friend of the Kommandant. He does not approve of the war. He clashes with Ulmann over his alcohol consumption, and Ulmann warns the Kommandant that his behaviour could cause the SS to take over the camp. Major Schaeffer has a particular distaste for the Nazi Regime and Prussian Militarism, something which he openly mocks during his periods of intoxication.
- Oberstabsarzt Dr Starb (Kenneth Griffith) – A very stuffy Major (Oberstabsarzt) who serves briefly on the camp medical staff. He is irritated at the relaxed discipline of the British and decides to enforce saluting. He is a small, short-tempered man who likes to feel superior. He finds many things irritating and the smallest thing can make him angry. He feels that the prisoners and staff at Colditz are lazy and stupid. When he gets Carter court-martialled for failing to salute, the Kommandant has him removed for fear of prisoner reprisals. Dr Starb was apparently based on a real doctor who served in Colditz and had a prisoner court-martialled for failing to salute.
- Unterfeldwebel Ernst Krueger (Leonard Fenton) – The canteen sergeant, has a strong propensity for playing card games, in particular three card brag. Involves himself in playing cards with notorious card sharp Flt Lt Jack Collins which consequently results in him compromising his position. Is caught aiding and abetting a planned escape by Collins as a repayment for his losses in the card school and is subsequently transferred to the military prison at Leipzig to await court martial. A popular character with the other members of the garrison, Krueger is found guilty and subsequently shot by a firing squad which results in antagonism between the German guards and certain British prisoners, particularly Collins.
- Unterfeldwebel Blatau (Roy Pattison) – An administrative clerk for Hauptmann Ulmann, Blatau prepares the briefing papers which Ulmann uses to thwart an SS takeover of Colditz.
- Unteroffizier Henneberg (Gertan Klauber) – A camp guard who professes religious piety by handing out Bibles to prisoners. Henneberg's outward persona disguises his true nature as a thief and bully. Henneberg begins to steal items from the prisoners' Red Cross parcels, and his behaviour results in his being murdered by Captain Alan Marshall. Aware of the actions of Henneberg, the Kommandant decides to disguise his murder as suicide in order to convince the Gestapo that there was no breach of order or discipline inside Colditz. The Kommandant explains the suicide of Henneberg as a consequence of him becoming melancholy upon receiving news that his son, a serving soldier in the Wehrmacht, had been killed in action on the Eastern Front.

==== Oflag VII-C ====
- Kommandant (Michael Sheard) – Kommandant of Oflag VII-C. Oberst (Colonel) Reichtleig an archetypal German officer, who does all he can to intimidate the newly arrived British prisoners; pointing out the futility of any attempts to escape.

==== Gestapo ====
- Brauner (Peter Barkworth) – A chief plain-clothes Gestapo officer of unknown rank. He is intentionally intimidating with his precision and cold curiosity. He is not afraid to torture uncooperative subjects of his interrogations, as Phil Carrington discovers the hard way.
- Sturmbannführer (Nigel Stock) and Hauptsturmführer (Terrence Hardiman) – The "Good Cop, Bad Cop" Gestapo team who attempt to determine Player's identity when one of their agents captures him. They seem complete opposites, an angry, loud-mouthed, pompous, grumpy old man and a calm, helpful, kind vegetarian. But in private, it is revealed, they are just like other: sly, sneaky and cruel.

==== SS ====
- Obergruppenführer Berger (David King) – Obergruppenführer Gottlob Berger was the real-life SS commander who took over the Leipzig/Colditz area late in the war and was in charge of the removal of the Prominente from Colditz. He is portrayed in the series as a boisterous but unyielding individual for whom everyone holds a measure of fear, even Major Mohn.
- Hauptsturmführer Schankel (John Pennington) – Schankel is a yes-man who puts up with the patronising attitude of his superior officer with a smile.

==== Miscellaneous ====
- Baumann (Ralph Michael) – The civilian lawyer, sympathetic to prisoners and intent on imposing the letter of German law, who agrees to take Carter's case against Dr Starb.
- Leutnant Erich (Martin Howells) – Erich, the son of the Kommandant, is a Luftwaffe officer in his early twenties. He is anxious to fly for the Luftwaffe, despite the deep concern of his father and mother.
- Paul Graf von Eissinger (John Quentin) – Count Von Eissinger is a contact of Player's father, who was a diplomat in Germany before the war. He is apparently wealthy and well-connected. He broke his back years ago when his horse fell on him. He had it shot dead. He regretted this later, because due to his broken back (which would not mend) he did not have to go to war. Although he is willing to help identify Player, he has the ulterior motive of using Player in a conspiracy to overthrow Hitler. Player turns this down and is sent to the PoW camp.
- Gerda (Sarah Craze) – Gerda is the young German organist at the Colditz town church. She falls for the dashing Capitaine Vaillant and helps him to escape, feeling for him as she does for her brother who is a POW in the Soviet Union.

== Series overview ==
Series	Episodes	Originally released	
Series	Episodes	First released	Last released
1	15	19 October 1972	25 January 1973
2	13	7 January 1974	1 April 1974

== Episodes ==
=== Series 1 (1972–1973) ===
No. overall	No. in series	Title	Written by	Original release date
1	1	"The Undefeated"	Brian Degas	19 October 1972
Pat Grant is captured at Dunkirk and sent along with many other British Officers to Oflag VIIC, Laufen. Together with his colleagues, both a rooftop escape and a tunnelling escape are attempted. The latter works, and Pat escapes dressed as a townswoman. After several days on the run, Pat is caught and sent to Laufen once more. Oberst Reichtleig, the Kommandant of Oflag VIIC, disgusted with Pat, sends him to the Sonderlager, Oflag IVC, Colditz.
2	2	"Missing, Presumed Dead"	Ian Kennedy Martin	26 October 1972
Follows the story of Flight Lt Carter. Highlights his recent marriage and the offer from his influential father-in-law to get him a safer posting. He chooses to fly Wellingtons and is shot down. The episode then follows his ongoing escapes till being sent to Colditz.
3	3	"Name, Rank, and Number"	Arden Winch	2 November 1972
Dick Player finds himself in trouble when he tries to escape from Reich Security detention and is recaptured without any prisoner ID. The Gestapo suspect he is a spy, and he must find some way to convince them that his perfect German and intimate knowledge of the countryside is the result of his spending a lot of his childhood in Germany before the war.
4	4	"Welcome to Colditz"	N.J. Crisp	9 November 1972
Phil Carrington finds himself chased down in the countryside by Reich Security, and Colonel Preston arrives at Colditz to find everything in disarray. The Colonel is initially unpopular as Senior British Officer as he cracks the whip to get everyone in line. He attempts initially to have his way with the Kommandant by lying about the rules of the Geneva Convention and entering into a gentleman's agreement that no Poles will be allowed in the British quarters.
5	5	"Maximum Security"	John Kruse	16 November 1972
The new Security Officer, Hauptmann Ulmann, arrives to replace the drafted Oberleutnant Lehr. The prisoners are wary of their new opponent, who seems much more skilled than his predecessor. Ulmann is aghast at the drunkenness of the second-in-command, the Kommandant's friend Willi, and this is a source of tension between him and the Kommandant. Suddenly, the SS arrive for a conference, much to the Kommandant's consternation, and the Standartenführer makes a bid to take over the camp.
6	6	"The Spirit of Freedom"	Marc Brandell	23 November 1972
Carrington makes himself unpopular with the other prisoners by revealing his admiration for Nazi politics, which he apparently cultivated during his service as a journalist in Berlin before the war. After much harassment is directed at him, the Kommandant allows him his own separate room in which to write a book on Nazi politics. He intends to publish it in America, with Gestapo permission. Unfortunately, before it is sent off, the Gestapo discovers that within his manuscript, Carrington has encoded details of the Germans’ planned invasion of the USSR, intended as a message to the American people, and that by producing the manuscript he hoped to be released and hence escape.
7	7	"Lord, Didn't It Rain"	Arden Winch	30 November 1972
Dick Player makes an escape but suffers dreadfully because of ongoing bad weather and rain and at one point is given a lift by an SS officer. He becomes sick, runs out of money, and eventually tries to get help from the American consulate who turns him down. This in reality was the circumstances of an escape by Anthony Murray 'Peter' Allan.
8	8	"The Traitor"	John Brason	7 December 1972
Several escapes that should have worked end badly, with Ulmann waiting for them in hiding spots along the way. Suspecting an informer, Colonel Preston asks the other senior officers to interrogate their contingents. His suggestion is met with scorn, but he proceeds to interrogate the British and the others grudgingly follow suit. The perpetrator is caught: a Polish officer whose family was threatened with torture by the Gestapo. The Poles court-martial him and condemn him to death, despite the extenuating circumstances. Colonel Preston tries to get him reprieved, with the help of the Catholic priest, but to no avail. Finally, he goes to the Kommandant, who sends Ulmann to rescue the Polish traitor. (This episode was drawn from the real-life events involving Lieutenant Ryszard Bednarski, a Polish army officer in Colditz who turned informer apparently after the Gestapo threatened his family. Though the court-martial did in fact take place, in reality the Polish Senior Officer requested the Colditz commandant to remove Bednarski from the camp; Bednarski survived his imprisonment but committed suicide after the war upon meeting a fellow Colditz prisoner in Poland. The incident also inspired a subplot in The Colditz Story.)
9	9	"Bribery and Corruption"	N.J. Crisp	14 December 1972
The British Officers find out that one of the German guards is in need of 1,000 marks for an abortion for his mistress. They use this information and offer a bribe for him to look the other way as they escape out of a tunnel. Col Preston finds out about his wife's death and is awarded the Distinguished Service Order. In reality the tunnel escape in question was attempted on the evening of 29 May 1941. Pat Reid and Rupert Barry were among the officers in the escape attempt, Paul Priem was the German Security Officer rather than Reinhold Eggers. The guard reports the bribe attempt, and the prisoners - including Colonel Preston - are captured coming out of the tunnel. The guard is promoted and transferred to another camp.
10	10	"Tweedledum"	John Brason	21 December 1972
Wing Commander Marsh, an assistant to the British Medical Officer, decides to use his extensive knowledge of mental illness for an escape. He proposes to "go insane" and be repatriated. Colonel Preston agrees to let him, so long as he follows through with it to the bitter end. Marsh does a very thorough job: his bizarre, disruptive behaviour continually annoys the other allied officers, who are mostly unaware of the scheme. However, the Germans are not convinced, and Ulmann asks a Corporal to observe Marsh closely. The Corporal has a brother who is insane, so Ulmann believes he is a better judge of Marsh's condition than any doctor. The Kommandant initially refuses to allow the Swiss authority to examine Marsh but relents when Marsh's evident madness embarrasses him in front of an important visitor. By the time the Germans are willing to consider repatriation, Marsh has done such a convincing job that even the Doctor is uncertain whether or not Marsh is simply pretending to be insane. After Marsh has been successfully repatriated to the UK, Colonel Preston receives a letter from Marsh's wife, revealing her husband's feigned psychosis has become genuine, and that he has been committed to a mental hospital for long-term care, with little hope of recovery. Colonel Preston immediately forbids any further escape attempts along the same lines. The method of escape is based on that used by Ion Ferguson, a Royal Army Medical Corps doctor imprisoned in Colditz, who certified a number of prisoners as insane in Stalag IV-D, who were then repatriated to Britain. Ferguson then feigned his own insanity to gain repatriation in 1945. Ferguson detailed his escape in his account of his wartime experiences, Doctor at War, and the episode, Tweedledum, is a fictionalised account of his means of escape retold as tragedy. Bryant was nominated for a Bafta for his performance in this episode. In a review of the series, The Guardian describes "Tweedledum" as "the standout episode, for its ingenious plan and astonishing acting".
11	11	"Court Martial"	Marc Brandell	28 December 1972
The unwelcome arrival of Dr Starb, an uptight Wehrmacht Major who is intent on enforcing prisoner discipline at all costs, shakes up the camp. Despite counsel to the contrary from the Kommandant, Dr Starb insists on enforcing the old German military rule that prisoners must salute German officers. Following disrespect from Carter, he acquires a grudge against the young flight fieutenant, who devises a scheme to get himself court-martialled so that he can escape in transit. True to form, Starb court-martials him and, accompanied by Phil Carrington (who is desperate to escape), they head to Leipzig for the trial. While Baumann, an aged German lawyer, prepares Carter's case, the two plot their escape. This takes place in September 1941, as the Germans reach Leningrad. Carter is convicted but merely cautioned, and Carrington fails to escape.
12	12	"Murder?"	Ian Kennedy Martin	4 January 1973
A German sentry is found dead in the parcels office one morning. The Germans insist it was suicide, in order that the Gestapo will not investigate, but Carter observed the body before it was touched, and insists it was murder. He and Colonel Preston attempt to find out who in the camp was responsible before the Gestapo discover that the death was not, indeed, suicide.
13	13	"The Way Out"	Bryan Forbes	11 January 1973
The story of a Scottish commando named McDonald who receives a "Dear John" letter from his wife saying she is pregnant by another man. As a consequence, he is given a place on a French escape attempt in which he is shot and killed at the wire outside the castle wall.
14	14	"Gone Away Part I"	John Brason	18 January 1973
The first of a two-part season finale which follows the true story of how Pat Reid and Hank Wardle (characterised as Pat Grant & Phil Carrington) escaped from Colditz. The episode opens with a meeting of Player pressing an argument for approval of an escape plan. Player becomes emotive when his plan is rejected and states an escape is needed for morale since, "Two successful British escapes in two years is nothing to crow about". There then follows an account of the famous 'tea chest' escape done in reality by Flt Lt Dominic Bruce (the ironically named "Medium Sized Man"). However, the TV series shows Carter being captured outside the castle when in fact Bruce got as far as the U Boat pens at Danzig (now Gdansk). The information gathered by Carter during the tea chest escape attempt is then used to bridge the gap in Player's previously rejected plan. Player with Muir and Grant with Carrington are agreed as the escapees to use separate routes after escaping Colditz; Grant and Carrington via Zwickau and Munich, Player and Muir via Chemnitz and Nuremberg. The episode ends on a point of drama with Brent seeming to have bungled his role in assisting the implementation of the escape.
15	15	"Gone Away Part II - With The Wild Geese"	John Brason	25 January 1973
Grant, Carrington, Player and Muir escape Colditz before separating into two pairs to travel via separate routes as planned in the previous episode. Player and Muir receive no further coverage of their effort in this episode. Grant and Carrington evade detection travelling by train via Regensburg to Rottweil in Southern Germany. Grant and Carrington cross the Swiss border on foot via what in reality was the Singen route.

=== Series 2 (1974) ===
No. overall	No. in series	Title	Written by	Original release date
16	1	"Arrival of a Hero"	N.J. Crisp	7 January 1974
Still seething over the "home-run" achieved by Pat Grant and Phil Carrington, Ulmann interrogates the recaptured Dick Player ceaselessly but without success. Meanwhile, the Kommandant is advised that he will have a new second-in-command, Major Horst Mohn, who arrives amidst the prisoners' jubilation over the success of their two colleagues. Mohn informs the Kommandant that he has been sent from the Führer's personal staff after having received high decorations for his combat exploits and a severe wound in the stomach from a Russian bayonet. He also indicates that Hitler was informed of the successful escape attempt and insists that security be tightened up. Mohn then proceeds to antagonise the prisoners one by one, particularly Carter, whose intimate letters to Cathy he reads with great interest. Because of the friction created, the Kommandant becomes determined that Mohn should be removed from Colditz.
17	2	"Ghosts"	John Brason	14 January 1974
Player is interrogated by the new escape officer, Carter, who discovers that the main impediment to escapes is that the Germans are alerted to escapes too soon. Carter attempts to devise a strategy of covering escapes by ensuring appel counts remain the same. He does this by faking escapes, and hiding the officers concerned in a hole somewhere in the camp, to be used on appels after real escapes. The spot he chooses is the hole under the pulpit in the chapel. Unfortunately for the escape team, and for the dismayed British padre, the Kommandant decides to close the chapel due to its use in French prisoner escape attempts. This traps Player and Brent in the pulpit without provisions, and the British medical officer gives Carter only two days to get them out.
18	3	"Odd Man In"	Arden Winch	21 January 1974
The British contingent is upset at the arrival of an apparent "black sheep" in their midst: Pilot Officer Lawrence Page, an antisocial Royal Air Force prisoner who does not seem to be able to get along with anyone and behaves oddly at his first appel. At the request of Simon Carter, Page is questioned by another RAF officer, Jimmy Walker, who discovers inaccuracies in Page's story, making it obvious he is not really an RAF officer. Suspected of being a German stool pigeon, Page is interviewed privately by Colonel Preston and Carter and reveals his true identity i.e. that he is an SOE agent. Carter then has the task of confirming this with the help of his wife back in London, using coded messages in his letters to her. Carter and Preston are sworn to secrecy whilst this process is going on. Walker, who still believes that Page is a German spy becomes impatient and starts a fight with Page. Unfortunately for Walker, Page has been trained to kill and maim without hesitation, and Walker ends up with badly gouged eyes. Subsequently, Carter is able to confirm Page's identity as an SOE agent. However, the many dangerous missions Page has experienced have left him a deeply embittered and damaged person who simply wishes to be left alone. Page's dilemma is that he is in a no-win situation i.e. if he is unmasked by the Germans in Colditz then he will definitely be shot as a spy, whereas if he escapes he will be obliged to resume his SOE activities – with a high risk of being captured, tortured by the Gestapo and then executed. As a result, Page wishes to spend the rest of the war in Colditz disguised as a POW.
19	4	"The Guests"	Troy Kennedy-Martin	28 January 1974
A Hauptsturmführer of the SD arrives at the Colditz town jail with three British commandos. He intends to keep this fact a secret, but it leaks both to Colonel Preston and the Kommandant. Preston, aware of Hitler's order that all commandos are to be shot, pressures the Kommandant to take the commandos under his jurisdiction. In an apparent and unusual bout of helpfulness, Mohn suggests to the Kommandant that he could use his high connections to have the commandos transferred to the castle. This is done, but Mohn has ulterior motives. He predicts correctly that the British contingent will attempt to help the commandos escape, and use their best escape plan, the one successfully used by Grant and Carrington to make their home run. Ulmann, anxious to rectify his embarrassment, goes along with Mohn's plan to trap the prisoners while the Kommandant is away, which they do. The commandos are later supposedly to be transferred to another camp, but are actually shot en route.
20	5	"Frogs in the Well"	Thom Keyes	4 February 1974
The British discover a potential escape route through the boarded-up camp theatre. Despite protest from Mohn, the Kommandant agrees to Colonel Preston's request to have the theatre, which was used for an escape the previous year, reopened. Ulmann is enthusiastic about the idea, hoping to catch the prisoners in the act of plotting to escape. While the prisoners manage to get around Ulmann's heightened security measures, they encounter an unforeseen problem when the French have the same idea of using the safe route out of the theatre. However, the attempts go ahead.
21	6	"Ace in the Hole"	David Ambrose	11 February 1974
Carter's hopes are raised by the arrival of Squadron Leader Tony Shaw, a decorated RAF hero. Ulmann is convinced that the celebrity prisoner will be trouble. However, Shaw appears far more interested in pursuing his pre-war role as a professor of literature, quickly rejuvenating the British officers' education classes – much to the joy of the peace-loving librarian. Disappointed, Carter tries to shame Shaw into taking more of a part in escape plans, but to no avail. But when Shaw discovers a closed-off room in the attic above the library and conceives an audacious plan to build and fly a glider out of the castle, Shaw snaps into action with the full backing of the SBO. The librarian is dismayed to find his library used as mere cover for the escapers' activities.
22	7	"French Leave"	Ken Hughes	18 February 1974
Irritated at the British contingent having to receive war news via the French prisoners, who have two wireless units, Carter is asked to request one of them for the British. The request is refused by the dashing Captain André Vaillant. He expresses frustration with being kept as a prisoner of war despite the fact that France is no longer at war with Germany following the Vichy agreement. He is forced to eat his words when Mohn triumphantly announces to the French contingent that because they are no longer prisoners of war, they are being moved to a labour camp in Poland where things would be much more difficult for them. Meanwhile, the pastor of Colditz protestant church makes a request to the Kommandant that the prisoners' choir sing at the town church during the Bishop of Leipzig's visit at Easter. The Kommandant reluctantly agrees when he hears the choir singing Bach melodies. As the rest of the French contingent resign themselves to their fate, Vaillant takes the opportunity during rehearsals to seek help from the church organist, a young German woman. She assists him in a daring escape during the concert and takes him home; one of her brothers is dead and another is a prisoner of war in the USSR, which makes her sympathetic to Vaillant. They sleep together, and she reluctantly agrees to go with him when he takes a train the next day on the first stage of his journey back to France posing as a foreign worker, but changes her mind at the station. Mohn is on their trail, and the episode closes with her arrest while praying in the church.
23	8	"The Gambler"	N.J. Crisp	25 February 1974
Flight Lieutenant Jack Collins arrives at Colditz. He is a hardened gambler who sometimes cheats. Collins wants no help from the rest of the British officers and intends to use his own escape methods. He feels that if he can escape he will make it home, based on his pre-war knowledge of Germany, fluent German and the fact that some his former clients in Germany were Jews who were hiding that fact and will be susceptible to blackmail. Collins uses his card skills to pull Brent into betting everything including his house, and losing it. Collins also uses marked cards in playing with a German guard and manages to win so much that the guard is forced to get a metal ID tag for civilian workers in the castle for use by Collins in escaping. However, this is discovered by Mohn, and the guard is subsequently shot as a traitor. Now unpopular, Collins is struck by a guard and a riot among the prisoners is only narrowly averted. Preston takes the opportunity to burn the papers relating to Brent's gambling debt.
24	9	"Senior American Officer"	Ivan Moffat	4 March 1974
The lone American officer at Colditz gets a thrill when three other Americans arrive. One of them turns out to be former inmate Phil Carrington, now promoted to major and sporting a bushy beard. The senior American officer is Colonel Dodd. The third is a captain. These three are taken to the solitary confinement block and at Mohn's suggestion are given preferential treatment with better food and newspapers so as to arouse the suspicions of the British. It is gradually revealed to viewers that the Gestapo have an interest in these three, who failed to reveal their connections to Hungarian military leaders under interrogation. To tackle the suspicions, Colonel Preston gets Colonel Dodd to explain more or less what the three Americans were doing in Hungary, and it turns out that they were, indeed, involved with trying to make contact with senior officers in Hungary. Carter and Carrington realise, as the story is being told, that they are under surveillance, and devise a plan to flush out the eavesdropper.
25	10	"Very Important Person"	Ivan Moffat	11 March 1974
The 'Prominente' (prisoners connected to prominent families) held at Colditz are to be at last used in their capacity as hostages as the war nears a conclusion. To accommodate this requirement, and to ensure there is no more trouble with escaping prisoners, Obergruppenführer Gottlob Berger of the Waffen-SS is put in charge of all prisoners of war in the area. He pays an unannounced visit to the Kommandant to explain the situation, and orders that the Prominente be moved out of Colditz the next morning; if they are not ready, the SS will take the castle over and prisoners will start to be shot. The Kommandant, fearing bloodshed, asks Colonel Preston and Major Carrington do their best to quell the upset the planned removal will cause. The situation is further complicated when the Germans decide that Lt Phipps, the son of an American ambassador, is to be classified as a Prominente prisoner and moved with the others. The bedridden Colonel Dodd agrees to the plan of two British officers to help Phipps evade removal by appearing to escape. However, the SS threaten to shoot hostages if the prisoner is not found, and accordingly Phipps is given up.
26	11	"Chameleon"	Robert Muller	18 March 1974
Major Mohn is left in charge of the camp as the Kommandant is called away to an emergency meeting. Mohn is unsympathetic to Colonel Preston's requests for more rations or the ability to keep animals for sustenance. On a visit to a bar in the town, he meets with a woman named Anna, apparently an old flame. She introduces him to her brother, who has recently arrived from the front. They argue about the likely end of the war. The brother warns Mohn that he could be in trouble because of his involvement with the Nazi party. While initially defiant, Mohn sees the writing on the wall and panics, returning to the camp and making attempts to endear himself to the prisoners and get them to agree in writing that he has treated them well. He simultaneously burns every bridge by blackmailing Ulmann and the Kommandant, and the latter relieves him of duty. When his last lifeline, Anna, rejects his plea for help since she is being watched, he makes his last bid for freedom - in prisoner-style.
27	12	"Death Sentence"	N.J. Crisp	25 March 1974
Mohn's legacy lives on in Colditz in the form of the death sentence hanging over Carrington's for having threatened lives in the "Very Important Person" episode. Colonel Dodd and Colonel Preston refuse to cooperate with the Kommandant until he is reprieved. Meanwhile, the Kommandant gives an open invitation to his officers to bring their wives and families into the safety of the castle as the front line nears Colditz. His wife joins him, but Ulmann is unable to travel there. Obergruppenführer Berger of the Waffen-SS takes military control of the Colditz region, making escapes a very dangerous proposition. Nevertheless, Squadron Leader Tony Shaw, the maker of the Colditz glider is determined to see it fly and opts to fly Dodd out to try and reach the American line so that they can intervene before Carrington is executed. News that his son has died causes the Kommandant to gain a new perspective on his situation, and new courage.
28	13	"Liberation"	Ivan Moffat	1 April 1974
The most dangerous time for the prisoners begins as the fighting gets ever closer to Colditz. Shaw eventually accepts that the glider will never fly out of the castle. The Kommandant comes to Colonel Preston with a plea for a guarantee that he and his men will be delivered to the American forces and treated as prisoners of war. Colonel Preston and Colonel Dodd agree on condition that command of the castle garrison is immediately relinquished to them. The Kommandant reluctantly complies, and Colonel Preston takes command. With roles reversed, the SBO coordinates the running of Colditz and its German guard and everyone takes part in a last evening celebration. The next morning, US troops arrive, and the prisoners leave in trucks to be taken to an airfield.

== Reception ==
Colditz became the most successful drama in BBC history, with more than seven million viewers for each episode. Clive James approved of how it was "more realistic than any POW movie yet made". It caused sales of existing books on Colditz to greatly rise.

Colditz prisoners' opinions varied. Describing it as "history as well as entertainment", Reid said that he had tried to maintain realism. Dick Howe, Reid's successor as escape officer, could not sleep because of old memories. Micky Burn approved of it as "imaginatively conceived and brilliantly acted and, with a few reservations, authentic as well as gripping". Other prisoners denounced it as "really ridiculous", "completely unrealistic", and "bloody awful". Airey Neave disliked how the show implied that Reid and not he was the first British escapee from Colditz, and that life there was like a holiday camp. Reid said that "Neave's arguments are sound", and that the actors were not thin enough and their uniforms were too new.

== Historical accuracy ==
Many of the events depicted in the series are based on fact. Exceptions for dramatic purposes include the mentions of the Kommandant's son, Colonel Preston's wife and mother, and the completely fictional Major Mohn, who appears in series two. While there is not a direct one-to-one relationship between the real and televised characters, most of the televised characters are loosely based on one or several actual persons. The most obvious are Pat Grant (Pat Reid) and Hauptmann Ulmann (Reinhold Eggers).

No mention was made in the series of Squadron Leader/Group Captain Douglas Bader, the real-life RAF pilot who lost both legs in a plane crash before the war and ended up in Colditz after various escape attempts from other camps. He remained imprisoned until the liberation.

== DVD release ==
A 10-disc Region 2 Box Set DVD of the complete series was released on 15 November 2010 including bonus mock-up cards of camp propaganda materials and a stapled character booklet.
