= Thomas Kolditz =

United States Army general

Thomas A. Kolditz (born July 23, 1956) is an American retired Brigadier General, educator, author, and consultant.

== Military ==
Kolditz led the Department of Behavioral Sciences and Leadership at the U.S. Military Academy West Point for 12 years, where he was responsible for teaching, research, and outreach activities in Management, Leader Development Science, Psychology, and Sociology. General Kolditz has more than 26 years in leadership roles and 34 years of military service. He was also the founding director of the West Point Leadership Center. General Kolditz has been a skydiving instructor since 1980 and served for 10 years as the senior instructor for the West Point Sport Parachute Team.

== Academic ==
Kolditz is a Fellow in the American Psychological Association. In 2007, while still on active duty, Tom was appointed a visiting professor at the Yale School of Management Leader Development Program and taught a crisis leadership course in their MBA curriculum. Later, he became the Director of the Leader Development Program at the Yale School of Management. Kolditz is also the founding Director of the Doerr Institute for New Leaders at Rice University.

== Personal ==
In the 2024 United States presidential election, Kolditz endorsed Kamala Harris.

== Consultancy ==
His first book, In Extremis Leadership: Leading As If Your Life Depended On It, published in 2007, is based on more than 175 interviews taken on the ground in Iraq during combat operations. His second book, Leadership Reckoning: Can Higher Education Develop the Leaders We Need?, announced a reform movement for leader development in higher education. Kolditz is also a keynote speaker.
