= Georg Martin Schädlich =

Georg Martin Schädlich was a corporal of the Wehrmacht during World War II, who kept a diary while he was a guard at Colditz castle prisoner-of-war camp from 1941 to 1943. This diary was later published by his grandson, Thomas Schädlich.

Schädlich was a first war veteran who was called up for service in the German Army in 1940. After service in France he was transferred to his home town to work as a prison guard. He kept his diary throughout his time at Colditz and it notably provides insight into the time spent in captivity there by Commandos from Operation Musketoon. Another diary kept by one of the youngest Musketoon Commandos, Eric Curtis, provides short annotations from the same period. The two diaries together enable comparing and contrasting the captor and prisoner experiences of the time.

Georg Martin Schädlich provides a key link to the Musketoon Commando's Diary as he was in very close contact with the Commandos and supervised their captivity. Schädlich, was known by the Colditz prisoner community as “The Ferret” or the “Corporal with the keys”. It was also said he could ‘sniff out a tunnel’ and the prisoners had a begrudging respect for his powers. Schädlich was also referred to in the Command Diary as their ‘good man’. Schädlich kept hold of the Commando Diary once the Commandos were taken away to Berlin.

Later in the war Schädlich lost his life in Italy, dying of a wound to the stomach. His family kept his diary and many years later his journal was published by his grandson, Thomas Schädlich.

== Bibliography ==
- Schädlich, Thomas (1992). Colditzer Schloßgeschichten: Die Geschichte des Oflag IV C in Colditz nach dem Tagebuch des Georg Martin Schädlich. Colditz, Germany: Swing Druck GmbH.
- Operation Musketoon - http://operationmusketoon.com/capture-execution/colditz-castle-oflag-ivc/colditz-diaries/
