= Paul Priem =

German World War II Wehrmacht officer (1893–1943)

- Born: 11 March 1893; Posen, Imperial Germany
- Died: 2 August 1943 (aged 50); Leipzig, Nazi Germany
- Military career
- Allegiance: German Empire; Nazi Germany
- Branch: Freikorps; Army
- Service years: ?1914–1919; 1939–1943
- Rank: Captain
- Commands: Security Officer, Oflag IV-C (1939–1943)
- Conflicts: World War I Greater Polish Uprising; World War II
- Other work: Teaching

Paul Priem (11 March 1893 – 2 August 1943) was a German officer in the Wehrmacht during World War II and a noted member of the German staff at the Colditz Castle Oflag IV-C POW camp.

During the Greater Poland Uprising of 1918–1919, he fought against the Polish insurrection as a second-lieutenant in the Freikorps. During the 1930s, he was a school headmaster in Leipzig until called up for active service in 1939.

He was subsequently given the post as the Security Officer at Colditz Castle and was known to the prisoners as being one of the more jovial of the Germans; Pat Reid, a successful POW escapee, said he "possessed a rare quality among Germans - a sense of humour". After Airey Neave's unsuccessful escape in a poor-quality German NCO disguise, Priem joked "Corporal Neave is to be sent to the Russian front". Heavy drinking, however, meant he was called before a medical board and found to be unfit for active service. Priem returned to teaching, and died from the effects of his drinking in August 1943.
