= Oflag IV-C =

German prisoner-of-war camp during World War II in Colditz, Saxony

- Colditz, Saxony
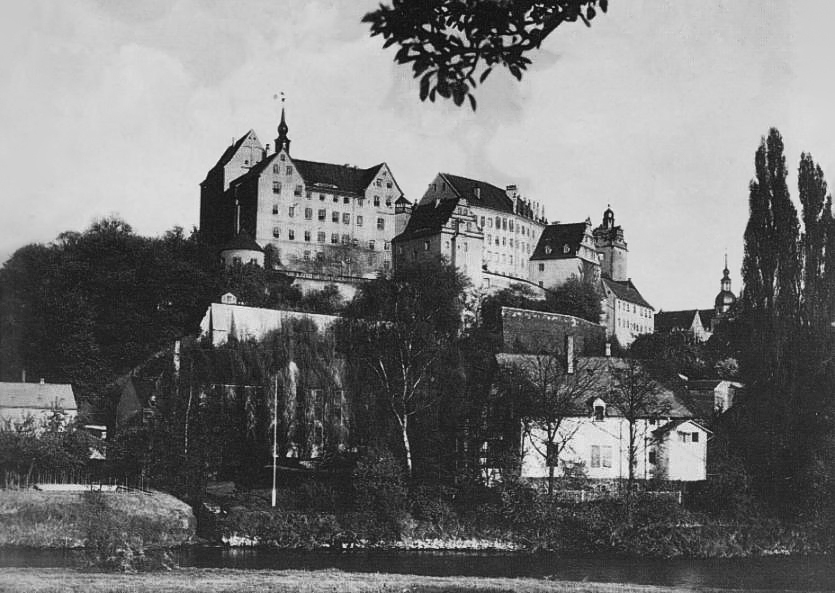
- Colditz Castle as Oflag IV-C, April 1945

Site information
- Type: Prisoner-of-war camp
- Controlled by: Nazi Germany

Location
- Germany, 1937
- Location within Germany
- Coordinates: 51.13078°N 12.80748°E

Site history
- In use: 1939–1945

Garrison information
- Occupants: Allied officers

Oflag IV-C, generally known as Colditz Castle, was a prominent German Army prisoner-of-war camp for captured Allied officers during World War II. Located in Colditz, Saxony, the camp operated within the medieval Colditz Castle, which overlooks the town. The word "Oflag" is an abbreviation of the German term Offizierslager, meaning "officers' camp". The camp held officers who were deemed escape risks or who had already attempted escape from other prison camps. Known for its seemingly impenetrable structure, Colditz Castle became a site of numerous escape attempts, some of which were successful, earning a reputation for the ingenuity and daring of its prisoners. The camp's history and the elaborate escape plans conceived there have been widely covered in postwar memoirs, books, and media. Today, Colditz Castle has become a popular tourist destination, with guided tours, exhibitions and a museum dedicated to the prisoners' lives.

== Colditz Castle ==
This thousand-year-old fortress was in the heart of Hitler's Reich, 650 kilometres (400 mi) from any frontier not under Nazi control. Its outer walls were two metres (seven feet) thick and the cliff on which it was built had a sheer drop of 75 metres (250 ft) to the River Mulde below.

== Timeline ==
In the first half of November 1939, Polish prisoners of war — officers convalescing from wounds sustained in the battles of Kock and Tomaszów Lubelski from the September Campaign — were sent to the camp. In December, generals were transferred from Oflag II-A Prenzlau, and senior officers from Oflag XI-A Osterode. On 13 December 1939, the camp held 632 officers and 101 enlisted men. After the French campaign in 1940, Polish officers were relocated from Colditz: generals to Oflag IV-B Königstein, officers to Oflag II-A Prenzlau, and officer cadets to Stalag VI-B Neu Versen.

In October 1940, Donald Middleton, Keith Milne, and Howard Wardle (a Canadian who joined the RAF just before the war) became the first British prisoners at Colditz.

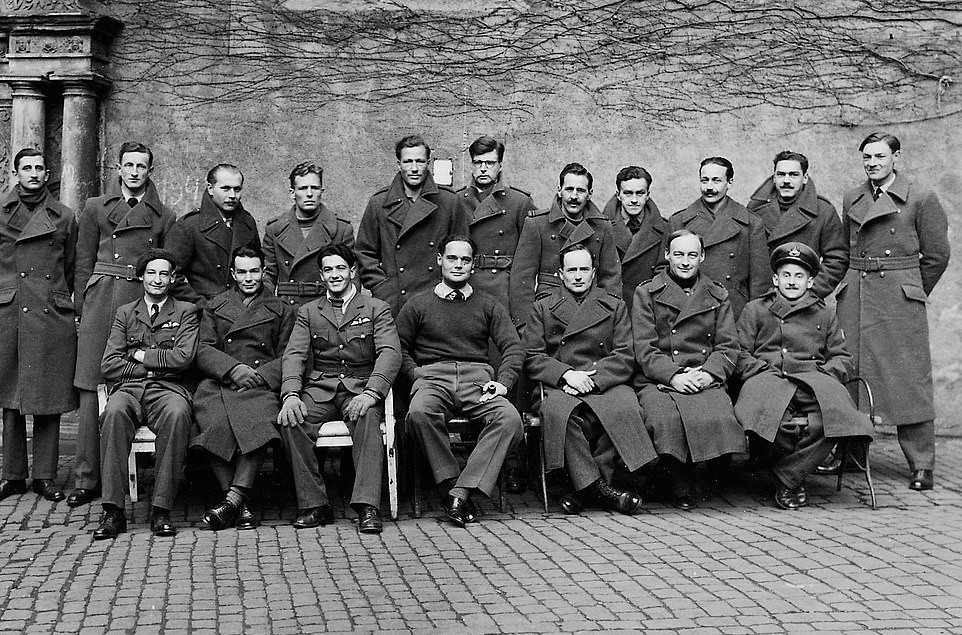
RAF group photograph at Colditz. Back row, from left to right: F/Lt Best, F/Lt Forbes, F/Lt Zafouk, F/Lt Flinn, F/Lt van Rood, F/Lt Halifax, F/Lt Donaldson, F/Lt Thom, F/Lt Milne, F/Lt Middleton, F/Lt Goldfinch. Front row, from left to right: F/Lt Dickenson, S/Ldr Stephenson, F/Lt Parker, S/Ldr Bader, S/Ldr McColm, S/Ldr Lockett, F/Lt Bruce.

On 7 November, six British officers, the "Laufen Six", named after the camp (Oflag VII-C) from which they made their first escape, arrived: Harry Elliott, Rupert Barry, Pat Reid, Dick Howe, Peter Allan, and Kenneth Lockwood. They were soon joined by a handful of British Army officers and later by Belgian officers. By Christmas 1940 there were 60 Polish officers, 12 Belgians, 50 French, and 30 British, a total of no more than 200 with their orderlies.

200 French officers arrived in February 1941. A number of the French demanded that French Jewish officers be segregated from them and the camp commander obliged; they were moved to the attics. By the end of July 1941, there were more than 500 officers: over 250 French, 150 Polish, 50 British and Commonwealth, 2 Yugoslavian. In April 1941, a French officer, Alain Le Ray, become the first prisoner ever to escape from the Colditz Castle.

On 24 July 1941, 68 Dutch officers arrived, mostly members of the Royal Netherlands East Indies Army who had refused to sign a declaration that they would take no part in the war against Germany which most other Dutch prisoners of war had accepted. According to the German Security Officer, Captain Reinhold Eggers, the Dutch officers appeared to be model prisoners at first. Importantly for other internees in the camp, among the 68 Dutch was Hans Larive, with his knowledge of the Singen route. This route into Switzerland was discovered by Larive in 1940 on his first escape attempt from an Oflag in Soest. Larive was caught at the Swiss border near Singen. The interrogating Gestapo officer was so confident the war would soon be won by Germany that he told Larive the safe way across the border near Singen. Larive did not forget and many prisoners later escaped using this route.

Within days after their arrival, the Dutch escape officer, Captain Machiel van den Heuvel, planned and executed his first of many escape plans. On 13 August 1941 the first two Dutchmen escaped successfully from the castle, followed by many more of whom six officers made it to England. Afterwards a number of would-be escapees borrowed Dutch greatcoats as their disguise. When the Wehrmacht invaded the Netherlands they were short of material for uniforms, so they confiscated anything available. The coats in Dutch field grey in particular remained unchanged in colour, since it was similar to the tone already in use by the Germans, thus these greatcoats were nearly identical with very minor alterations.

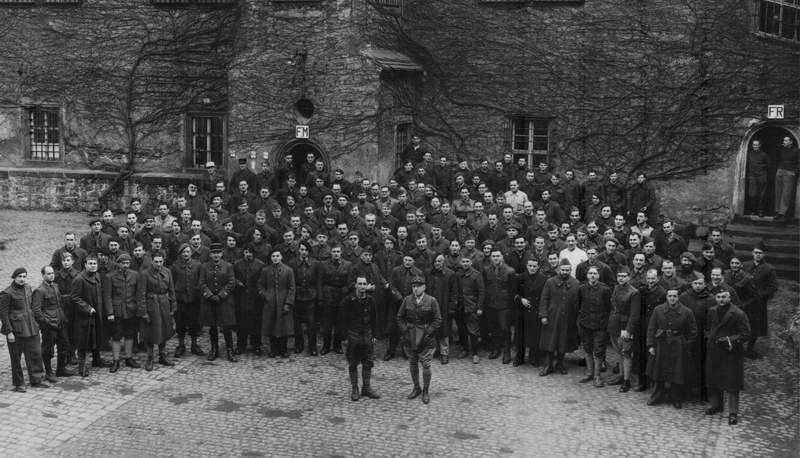
Some of the French officers held at Colditz

In May 1943, the Wehrmacht High Command decided that Colditz should house only Americans and Commonwealth. In June the Dutch were moved out, followed shortly thereafter by the Poles and Belgians. The final French group left 12 July 1943. By the end of July there were a few Free French officers, and 228 Commonwealth officers including Britons, Canadians, Australians, New Zealanders, South Africans, Irish, and one Indian.

On 23 August 1944 Colditz received its first Americans: 49-year-old Colonel Florimond Duke, Major Alfred Suarez, and Lieutenant Guy Nunn. They were counter-intelligence operatives parachuted into Hungary to prevent it joining forces with Germany. Population was approximately 254 at the start of the early winter that year.

On 19 January 1945 six French Generals — Lieutenant-General Jean Adolphe Louis Robert Flavigny, Major-General Louis Léon Marie André Buisson, Major-General Arsène Marie Paul Vauthier, Brigadier-General Albert Joseph Daine, and Brigadier-General René Jacques Mortemart de Boisse — were brought from the camp at Königstein to Colditz Castle. Major-General Gustave Marie Maurice Mesny was murdered by the Germans on the way from Königstein to Colditz Castle.

On 5 February, Polish General Tadeusz Bór-Komorowski, deputy commander of the Armia Krajowa (Home Army) and responsible for the Warsaw Uprising, arrived with his entourage.

In March, 1200 French prisoners were brought to Colditz Castle, with 600 more being imprisoned in the town below.

As allied forces neared, the prisoners worried that they would be killed to prevent their freedom. Czech RAF pilot "Checko" Chaloupka had a girlfriend in Colditz, Irmagard Wernicke, whose father was anti-Nazi. A guard, Heinz Schmidt, passed messages between Chaloupka and Irmagard. With their help, the prisoners set up an intelligence system in the village. They compiled files on Nazi and anti-Nazi citizens and prepared to, if necessary, violently escape and capture Colditz.

When the final battles of the war approached the area, the prisoners became concerned at the danger, both from the SS in the town who might kill them, or from the approaching Allied forces who might mistakenly attack the castle. They persuaded Eggers and other German officials and guards to surrender to them in secret. After the prisoners erected US, UK, and French flags on the castle walls, on 16 April 1945 Oflag IV C was captured by American soldiers from the 1st US Army.

== "Prominente" and notable inmates ==
Among the more notable inmates were British fighter ace Douglas Bader; Pat Reid, the man who brought Colditz to public attention with his post-war books; Airey Neave, the first British officer to escape from Colditz and later a British Member of Parliament; New Zealand Army Captain Charles Upham, the only combat soldier ever to receive the Victoria Cross twice; and Sir David Stirling, founder of the wartime Special Air Service.

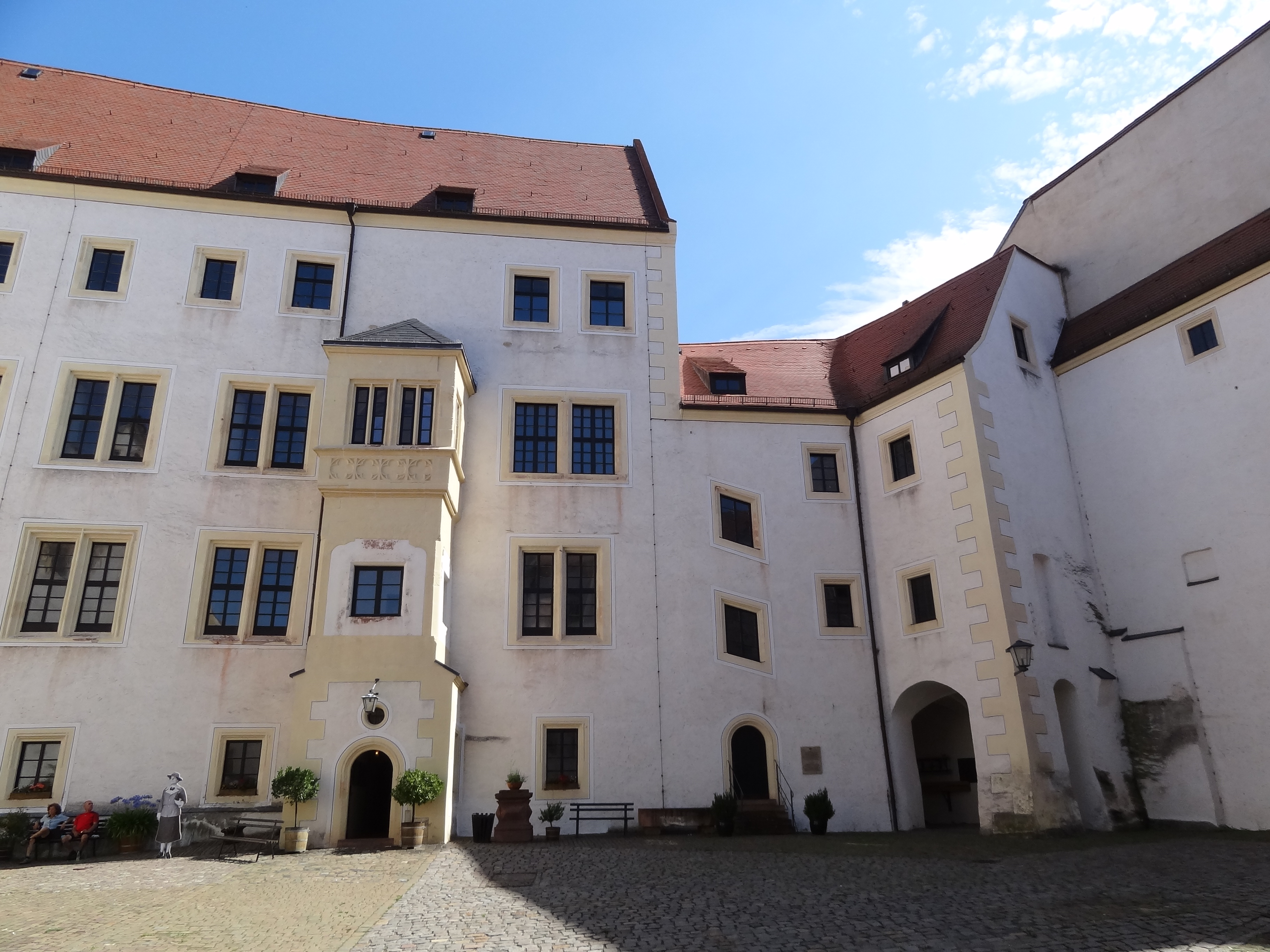
The inner courtyard of Colditz castle which was used as the prison yard when the castle was the POW camp Oflag IV-C during World War II. The door flanked by bushes was the entrance to the "Prominente" quarters. Note the cutout depiction of Lieutenant Bouley to the lower left-hand side of the photograph.

There were also prisoners called Prominente (German for 'celebrities'), relatives of Allied VIPs. The first one was Giles Romilly, a civilian journalist who was captured in Narvik, Norway who was also a nephew of Winston Churchill's wife Clementine Churchill. Adolf Hitler himself specified that Romilly was to be treated with the utmost care and that:

1. The Kommandant and Security Officer answer for Romilly's security with their heads.
2. His security is to be assured by any and every exceptional measure you care to take.

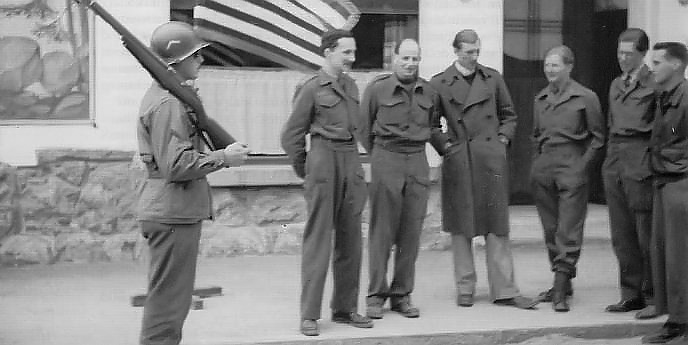
Members of the Prominente, under a U.S. guard, outside the Hungerberg Hotel on May 5, 1945, shortly after their release. L to R: John Elphinstone, Max de Hamel, Michael Alexander, unknown, George Lascelles, and John Winant Jr.

When the end of the war approached, the number of Prominente increased. Eventually there were Lord Lascelles and John Elphinstone, nephews of King George VI and Queen Elizabeth; Captain The Lord Haig, son of World War I Field Marshal Douglas Haig; Lord Hopetoun, son of Lord Linlithgow, the Viceroy of India; Lieutenant John Winant Jr., son of John Gilbert Winant, US ambassador to Britain; Tadeusz Bór-Komorowski, commander of Armia Krajowa and the Warsaw Uprising; and five other Polish generals. British Commando Michael Alexander claimed to be a nephew of field marshal Harold Alexander in order to escape execution, but was merely a distant cousin.

Micky Burn, another well-known inmate of Colditz, was a British commando captured at Saint-Nazaire. Burn had been a journalist like Romilly before the war, working for The Times. Burn had briefly been an admirer of the Nazi Party and in 1936 had met Adolf Hitler, who signed his copy of Mein Kampf. After war broke out Burn shifted politically to Marxism and gave lectures to prisoners at Colditz, but due to his pre-war interest in Nazi philosophy he was widely regarded with distrust and scorn.

John Arundell, 16th Baron Arundell of Wardour (1907–1944) was an aristocrat held at Colditz who, despite his pedigree, was not awarded Prominente status. Arundell made a habit of exercising in the winter snow; he contracted tuberculosis and died in Chester Military Hospital.

Another officer, not listed as among the Prominente but who became famous after the end of the war, was French military chaplain and Catholic priest Yves Congar, who was captured as a POW and later sent there after repeated attempts to escape. He became a noted theologian and was made cardinal in 1994, at age 90.

At 1:30 a.m. on 13 April 1945, while the final battles of the war approached the area, the Prominente were moved under guard and the cover of darkness, over the protestations of the other prisoners. The Allies were concerned that the Prominente might be used as hostages, bargaining chips and human shields, or that the SS might try to kill them out of spite. But they reached the American lines alive a couple of weeks later, an action aided by the SS head of POW camp administration Obergruppenführer Gottlob Berger, which contributed to his lessened sentence after his war crimes verdict in 1949.

== German staff and visitors ==
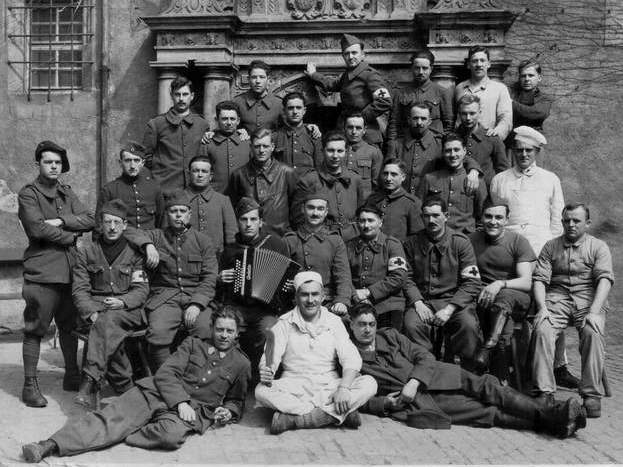
A group of the French orderlies from Colditz Castle poses for a picture in the inner courtyard.

Keeping the castle running in a secure and efficient manner was a difficult task, and the Germans maintained a larger garrison at the castle than at many of their other prison camps. Between 1939 and 1945 more than 70 German officers and enlisted men worked in a wide variety of staff positions, as well as overseeing prisoners' labour.

There was also a large contingent of civilians and local townspeople who worked on the castle grounds. Some were in maintenance, some in medical roles, some were there in a supervisory role (Nazi Party leaders, Swiss Red Cross observers, etc.). Some family members of the German military officers lived at the camp.

=== Security officers ===
- Captain Paul Priem was the first Security Officer. Pat Reid said he "possessed a rare quality among Germans – a sense of humour".
- Captain Reinhold Eggers was Security Officer from November 1940 until April 1945, promoted to chief of security in 1944. He was also the only English-speaker among the Germans at Colditz, thus was involved in every interaction with the prisoners or between the Senior Officers and the Kommandant serving as translator. Dutchman Lieutenant Damiaen J. van Doorninck said of him, "This man was our opponent, but nevertheless he earned our respect by his correct attitude, self-control and total lack of rancour despite all the harassment we gave him."

=== Kommandants ===
- Oberst Schmidt 1939 – August 1942
- Oberst Glaesche 1 August 1942 – 13 February 1943
- Oberst Prawitt 14 February 1943 – 15 April 1945

== Life in the camp ==
In Colditz, the Wehrmacht abided by the Geneva Convention. Would-be escapees were punished with solitary confinement, instead of being summarily executed. In principle, the security officers recognized that it was the duty of the POWs to try to escape and that their own job was to stop them. Prisoners could even form gentlemen's agreements with the guards, such as not using borrowed tools for escape attempts.

Most of the guard company was composed of World War I veterans and young soldiers not fit for the front. Because Colditz was a high security camp, the Germans organized three and then later four Appells (roll calls) per day to count the prisoners. If they discovered someone had escaped, they alerted every police and train station within a 40 km (25 mi) radius, and many local members of the Hitler Youth would help to recapture any escapees.

Because of the number of Red Cross food parcels, prisoners sometimes ate better than their guards, who had to rely on Wehrmacht rations. Prisoners could use their relative luxuries for trade and, for example, exchange their cigarettes for German Reichsmarks that they hoped could later use in their escape attempts. Occasionally this turned out to be a mistake as several of the bills they received were of varieties that were not considered valid.

Prisoners had to make their own entertainment. In August 1941 the first camp Olympics were organized by the Polish prisoners. Events were held in football (soccer), volleyball, boxing, and chess, but the closing ceremony was interrupted by a German fire drill. "The British came in last place in every event cheerfully, to the dismay of the other participants who took the competition deadly seriously," according to the British inmate John Wilkens in a 1986 interview. Prisoners also formed a Polish choir, a Dutch Hawaiian guitar band, and a French orchestra.

The British put on homemade revues, classical plays and farces including: Gaslight, Rope, The Man Who Came to Dinner, Pygmalion, and The Importance of Being Earnest. Several prisoners intentionally grew their hair long so as better to portray female roles. Prisoner Jock Hamilton-Baillie used to shave his legs, rub them in brown shoe polish, and draw a line down the back of his legs in pencil to simulate the appearance of silk stockings. This allowed him special "bath privileges" in the German guards washroom, since the prisoners' showers were unable to get the polish off his legs. Staging these plays even gained the prisoners access to "parole tools", tools which were used to build the sets and which the prisoners promised not to use for escape. During the summer months, the theatre's peak periods, there were new productions every two weeks. The biggest success of the theatre however was the Christmas-themed Ballet Nonsense which premiered on November 16, 1941, and ran until the November 18, 1941 show which Hauptmann Priem (the first prison warden of Colditz) attended.

Another pastime which occupied much of the prisoners' time was the production of moonshine alcohol. Initially started by the Polish contingent using a recipe of yeast, water, German jam and sugar from their Red Cross parcels, and then taken up by other prisoners, it did not take long for stills to be secreted all across Colditz (one of which remained undiscovered until a tourist trip in 1984). Prisoner Michael Farr, whose family ran Hawker's Gin (the sole purveyors of Sloe gin with a Royal Warrant), managed to make a sparkling wine dubbed "Château Colditz". Some prisoners would get black teeth or even temporary blindness from consuming this beverage — a condition known as "jam-happy" — as it contained many impurities. Although the German guards despised the drunken prisoners, they generally turned a blind eye to the distilling.

Officers also studied languages, learning from each other, and told stories. Most popular of these stories were the embellished retelling of BBC broadcasts by Jim Rogers. Since mail was regularly screened by censors, and the German newspapers received by prisoners contained much Nazi propaganda, the only reliable information prisoners could obtain on the progress of the war in Europe was through BBC broadcasts received via one of two radios which were secreted in the castle. These radios were smuggled in by French prisoner Frédérick Guigues and named "Arthur 1" and "Arthur 2". The first radio was quickly discovered because of a mole, but the second remained secreted until Guigues returned and removed it during a tour of the castle in 1965. The prisoners' "Radio Laboratory" was not permanently exposed until 1992 during repairs to the roof.

Later the most popular way to pass the time was stoolball, a particularly rough version of rugby, where there were two stools at either end of the prisoners' courtyard and goals were scored by touching the opponent's stool with the ball. This game served as an outlet for pent-up aggression, and also provided noise to cover the sounds of tunnel-digging.

In addition to escape attempts, prisoners tried to make the life of their guards more miserable by resorting to "goon-baiting", making nuisances of themselves by harassing the guards. For example, they would drop water bombs on the guards. Douglas Bader encouraged his junior officers to do the same. British Flight Lieutenant Pete Tunstall especially tried to cause havoc by disturbing the roll call even if nobody was trying to escape, so that the guards would not become suspicious when somebody was. He went through a total of five courts-martial and suffered a total of 415 days in solitary confinement.

== Escape attempts ==
The German Army made Colditz a Sonderlager (high-security prison camp), the only one of its type within Germany. Reichsmarschall Hermann Göring even declared Colditz "escape-proof." In spite of this claim, there were many well-documented escapes and failed attempts by British, Canadian, French, Polish, Dutch, and Belgian inmates. Between 30 and 36 men succeeded in their attempts - exact numbers differ between German and Allied sources.

== In popular culture ==
The escapes from Colditz, featured in many works of fiction or documentaries, popularized the unrealistic image of prisoner of war escapes by cheerful Allied prisoners. This is sometimes referred to as the "Colditz Myth".

Oflag IV-C did not receive special attention during the war; prisoners' letters home were censored, and the British government told escaped prisoners to not talk. Burn's two articles in The Times on 19 and 21 April 1945 were the first detailed descriptions of a prisoner-of-war camp, and his fictionalised account Yes, Farewell appeared in 1946. Oflag IV-C provided the inspiration for both television and film because of the widely popular retellings by Reid (The Colditz Story and The Latter Days) and Neave (They Have Their Exits). Reid's accounts of Colditz were especially influential in causing Oflag IV-C to become the most famous POW prison, and public interest in accounts of clever prisoners outwitting guards, to affect the image of all German POW prisons. This started as early as 1955 with the release of the film The Colditz Story, based on the Reid books, followed by The Birdmen in 1971, continuing until 2005 with the Colditz mini-series. The escape stories of Colditz Castle have inspired several board and video games, such as Escape from Colditz and Commandos.

After the success of the British accounts, Eggers wrote Colditz: The German Story based on his experiences. Like the Allied accounts, it was a best-seller. The commercially and critically successful 1972-1974 Colditz TV series caused Colditz books to again become best-sellers. By then the attention to Colditz, and to the boyish adventures there, was such that Alan Coren's review of the second series of the show humorously described it as "back to The Fifth Form at St. Colditz for a new term", and Burn's novel was reprinted as Farewell to Colditz. Even as later works offered more nuanced descriptions of the tedium and miseries of Colditz life, they acknowledged the continuing public interest in adventure with titles such as Escape from Colditz (2000).

=== Cinema ===
- The Colditz Story (1955) was a dramatic film re-enactment of life in the camp during World War II, based entirely on the books of Pat Reid, directed by Guy Hamilton for a British Academy of Film and Television Arts Award in 1956. It has been called an "Outstanding factual World War Two drama about Allied POW's held in Germany's most secure wartime prison."

=== Television and TV movies ===
- Escape of the Birdmen (1971) was a television movie loosely based on Pat Reid's book. This movie is of note in that it is the first movie based on Pat Reid's books to reference the Colditz glider, devised and built by Bill Goldfinch with Jack Best his partner in the construction.
- Colditz (1972–1974) was a television drama series aired on BBC1 television. It ran for a total of 28 episodes across two seasons, progressing in time from the opening of the camp until its liberation in 1945. The first three episodes of the series acted as an introduction to the plot of the show, and introduced the viewers to the three central characters by following the events that led up to their arrival at the camp. The series was a joint production between the BBC and Universal TV (an American company), but for reasons unknown, it never aired in the United States. Episodes 24 "A Very Important Person" and 25 "Chameleon" did however air in the US as a two-hour TV movie entitled Escape From Colditz, in 1974. A review of the film was printed in the newspaper The News Of The World, which praised it saying: "It has all the realism, dignity and courage of the men it commemorates." Its more notable actors include Jack Hedley as Lieutenant Colonel John Preston from 1972–74, Edward Hardwicke as Captain Pat Grant from 1972–73, Robert Wagner as Major Phil Carrington from 1972–74, David McCallum as Flight Lieutenant Simon Carter from 1972–74, and Dan O'Herlihy as Lieutenant Colonel Max Dodd in 1974.
- Escape from Colditz (2001) was a British Channel 4 television documentary.
- Colditz (2005) was a mini-series on ITV1, based on Henry Chancellor's book Colditz: The Definitive History, directed by Stuart Orme. This tale is much more fictional than its predecessors, with fictional characters and situations that are merely based on real people and events. It features Jason Priestley (Beverly Hills, 90210) as Rhett Barker, James Fox as Lt. Col. Jimmy Fordham, Damian Lewis (Band of Brothers) as Lt. Nicholas McGrade, Tom Hardy (Black Hawk Down) as Lt. Jack Rose, Sophia Myles (Thunderbirds) as Lizzie Carter, Guy Henry as Capt. Sawyer and Timothy West as Warren.
- In PBS's NOVA documentary series, "Escape From Nazi Alcatraz" (Season 41, Episode 12), is about a planned escape by a group of British officers from Colditz Castle.

=== Fiction ===
- The Colditz Legacy, Guy Walters, Headline, London, 2005, ISBN 0-7553-2717-9
- Yes, Farewell, Michael Burn, Jonathan Cape, London, 1946 ISBN 1-4191-7221-2
- The Narrow Door at Colditz, Robert L. Wise, Broadman & Holman Publishers, Nashville, 2004, ISBN 0-8054-3072-5
- Revenge of the Damned, Chris Bunch and Allan Cole, Del Rey Books, New York, 1989, ISBN 1-84149-080-6 features an escape from a thinly veiled "Koldyeze prison" clearly modelled on Colditz.
- Little Mabel's Great Escape, Jilly Cooper, Granada, 1981, ISBN 9780246111609, features an escape from a dog kennels inspired by Colditz.

=== Games ===
- Escape from Castle Colditz — a board game from Invicta Games in 1972.
- Escape from Colditz — a board game from Parker Brothers in 1973. This game was designed by Pat Reid and later re-designed by Gibson Games in the 1980s and as Skedaddle! by Crowhurst Games in 1992 and re-released again in 2011.
- Escape from Colditz — a 1991 video game developed by Digital Magic for the Amiga, was based on the Parker Brothers board game.
- Prisoner of War has two levels set in Colditz.
- Commandos 2: Men of Courage — the mission, Castle Colditz, is based on the same castle and involves assisting the escape of all allied prisoners in the castle.
- The Colditz Story — a 1987 video game published by Atlantis Software for the ZX Spectrum

=== Music ===
- Melbourne band "Colditz Glider" is named after the construction of a glider to escape Oflag IV-C. The group draws parallels between the prisoners drawn together to escape and the band creating music to escape.

=== Other media ===
- The Doctor Who audio play Colditz by Big Finish is based in Colditz, with the Seventh Doctor's companion Ace mentioning several well-known names and escape attempts.

== See also ==
- MI9
- Christopher Hutton

== Sources ==
- Booker, Michael (30 April 2005). Collecting Colditz and Its Secrets (Kindle ed.). Grub Street Publishing. ISBN 978-1904943082.
