= Michael Alexander (British Army officer) =

British Army officer (1920–2004)

Michael Charles Alexander (20 November 1920 – 19 December 2004) was a British Army officer, a World War II Prisoner of War held captive at Oflag IV-C, and later a writer.

Alexander was commissioned into the Duke of Cornwall's Light Infantry from Sandhurst. He joined the Commandos and later the Special Boat Service (SBS), a special forces unit that was created in 1940. The SBS was charged with a variety of classified tasks, including reconnaissance and sabotage. Alexander was promoted to Lieutenant in 1941.

== The capture ==
Working for the SBS, Alexander was a 21 year old lieutenant (and temporary captain) stationed in Alexandria, Egypt during the summer of 1942. As Alexander later described the episode, he and 20 others were assigned a mission to blow up a munitions dump behind enemy lines. The group travelled 30–40 miles by torpedo boat from Alexandria, and then, under cover of darkness, took rubber boats ashore. As they landed, the area burst into light and activity; their landing point turned out to also be the headquarters for the German 90th Light Infantry Division, a crack unit of the Afrika Corps. While the other 20 men returned quietly to their torpedo boat, Alexander and a colleague, Corporal Peter Gurney, decided to stay behind and attempt the mission. Under cover of darkness, they were able to blow up a tank transporter, but after a two-day effort to get back to British territory, they were captured.

== Circumstances of the capture ==
When captured, Alexander was wearing civilian clothes and an Afrika Corps hat. He was wearing civilian clothes (“silk shirt and gabardine trousers”) because he’d been called to re-do the same mission from earlier in the day, and so he’d rushed from the tennis courts back to his hotel in order to make it onto the torpedo boat. While walking amongst German encampments, he and Gurney hadn’t brought food and water. On the morning of the second day, the two had entered a 6-person German tent in order to eat their breakfast (spaghetti bolognese and coffee); Alexander had taken one of their hats to protect against the heat. He’d also taken three of their pistols (“us Brits rather liked us the Luger pistol.”) They’d tied up the Germans rather than kill them, which had allowed one of Germans to escape and sound the alarm that led to their capture.

And so, when captured, Alexander was in civilian clothes, was wearing a partial German uniform, and, as he was informed by a “nice, Oxford-educated German officer”, they would be charged with murder since the bombs that blew up the tank transporter had killed two soldiers sleeping inside. That German officer also told him that Adolf Hitler had specifically ordered that “anyone playing commando games” should be shot immediately. This information overlapped with what they’d already understood, that the Germans regularly killed "saboteurs".

Given this bleak situation, Gurney let on that Alexander was related to General Harold Alexander, who had recently arrived to command North Africa. Alexander played along with this false claim, gradually revealing that he was the general’s nephew. Gurney and Alexander recognized that the Germans might be willing to keep prominent prisoners alive so they could later be used as hostages. They were quickly evaluated by Field Marshal Erwin Rommel and General Westphal, who decided on imprisonment rather than execution.

Alexander and Gurney were sent to Talag, a prison in Berlin. From there, Alexander was transferred to Colditz Castle, a high security prison near Leipzig. Alexander was never able to identify what happened to Gurney after they were sent to Berlin together. Alexander later wrote that the idea that Gurney was “disposed of” in Berlin “haunts me.”

== Colditz Castle ==
During WW II, Colditz primarily housed Allied officers who were considered dangerous or escape risks. Within Colditz, Alexander joined the Prominente, a group of 21 prisoners that included two nephews of King George VI and two nephews of Winston Churchill. Intended to be used as hostages, the Prominente were separated from other prisoners and provided with modestly better provisions.

== Release ==
By 12 April 1945, as American gunfire could be heard in the distance, it became clear that the Allies were near victory. At that time, the Nazi head of POWs Obergruppenführer Gottlob Berger, a general of the Waffen-SS, informed the Prominente that Hitler had specifically requested that they be taken to the mountains where Hitler and some of his inner circle would be making their last stand. At that point, Berger indicated that they would all be killed. Berger then informed these influential prisoners that he would not carry out the Fuhrer’s order. Instead, he loaded the Prominente into two trucks and had them driven to the Americans. At the Nuremberg Trials, Berger claimed a variety of mitigating behaviours for other war crimes; historians appear to not believe his claims aside from the Colditz release, though they do question Berger’s motivation to release relatives of the King and Prime Minister as the war was ending. Ultimately the general served 6 years for war crimes.

Alexander was promoted Captain in 1946 and invalided out of the Army in 1951.

== Sources ==
- Nichol, John & Rennell, Tony (2002). The Last Escape : The Untold Story of Allied Prisoners of War in Germany 1944-1945. UK: Penguin Books. ISBN 9780141003887.
