= Reinhold Eggers =

German Army officer (1890–1974)

- Born: 1890
- Died: 1974 (aged 83–84)
- Military career
- Allegiance: Germany
- Branch: Imperial German Navy; German Army
- Service years: 1913–18; 1939–45
- Rank: Hauptmann
- Conflicts: World War I; World War II
- Awards: Iron Cross (1st Class); Hesse Medal
- Other work: Teacher, author

Reinhold Eggers (1890–1974) was the security officer at Oflag IV-C from November 1940 to April 1945, promoted to chief of security in 1944. The Nova television programme Nazi Prison Escape, a shortened cut of a British documentary series, was based on his books about Colditz. He spent 10 years in Soviet-ordered imprisonment following the war and was released in 1955.

== Pre-World War II ==
In March 1913, Eggers was called up for military service and was, on his request, posted to the 2nd Battalion of Marine Infantry (Seebataillon) at Wilhelmshaven. His battalion commander was the famed Paul Emil von Lettow-Vorbeck, who after six months personally promoted Eggers to Gefreiter. Eggers completed his training on 31 March 1914 and was promoted to the rank of Unteroffizier. After the outbreak of World War I he was ordered to join the First Regiment of Marine Infantry at Kiel. He was subsequently posted on the western front where he won the Iron Cross Second Class on 8 May 1915, the Iron Cross First Class and the Hesse Medal for bravery on the Somme in December 1915.

To cope with the Weimar Republic's hyperinflation in the 1920s he had to sell his whole fortune, which amounted to little more than 10,000 marks. Eggers and his wife bought an acre and a half of land at Reideburg. When conditions had somewhat stabilised he decided to start studying to regain his post as a teacher. In his years as a high-school teacher in the 1930s he promoted international relations and visited Britain and France with his students. He failed to anticipate the untrustworthiness of his fellow teachers, however, and in 1933 he was denounced by six of his colleagues to the Nazis, who accused him of being a left-winger and an internationalist. He was consequently only allowed to teach at elementary school. In 1934 he received his PhD from Halle University.

== World War II and Colditz ==
In 1939 he was recalled to the army as a reserve lieutenant. Because of his language skills he was sent to Oflag IV-A Hohnstein as a translator. The POWs at Hohnstein were mostly French officers, including 28 generals and an additional seven Dutch and 27 Polish generals. Eggers felt his experiences at this camp were poor preparation for his time at Colditz. POWs and guards treated each other with respect and there were no real problems or friction.

On 22 November 1940, Eggers received his orders to report to Oflag IV-C, Colditz Castle. He started as LO3 (Lager Offizier 3 or duty officer) and was faced with rebellious, anti-German POWs from Poland, France and the UK, who took every opportunity to harass their captors. Later these were joined by Belgian, Dutch and American officers.

Eggers tended to treat his opponents as difficult schoolboys and always tried to retain his calm and dignity even when provoked to the utmost. On one occasion his cap was stolen by a POW (to be measured and copied for an escape). He calmly waited for a guard to get a new one before he left the building. British and Dutch officers agreed that Eggers always treated them correctly. Lieutenant Damiaen J. van Doorninck, a former Dutch POW, wrote in his foreword for Eggers's book that:

This man was our opponent, but nevertheless he earned our respect by his correct attitude, self-control and total lack of rancour despite all the harassment we gave him.

His success at stopping most attempts to escape Oflag IV-C made Eggers a subject expert. He wrote many articles for the prison system's internal magazine, created a museum displaying escape tools and photographs (guards or prisoners themselves sometimes recreating escape attempts), and investigated French general Henri Giraud's escape from Oflag IV-B Königstein.

On 1 June 1941, Eggers was promoted to Hauptmann. In February 1944, he became the Security Officer for the camp, a post he retained until the camp was liberated by the U.S. Army in April 1945.

== After Colditz ==
After the liberation of Colditz Castle by the U.S. Army, Eggers retired from active service and returned to his post as a teacher in Halle, Saxony-Anhalt, as he was able to prove that he had never joined the Nazi Party. He became a headmaster and then a lecturer at Halle University.

In September 1946, as he was in the Soviet Occupied Zone, he was arrested by the Soviets and questioned about Gestapo agents in Colditz by the Soviet NKVD secret police.

Charged with crimes against humanity, spying and supporting a fascist regime, he was sentenced to ten years of hard labour. This was spent in Sachsenhausen and then Torgau Prison, before eventually being released in December 1955.

Eggers was in later years active in meeting with former Colditz inmates and writing his memoirs. He retired to live by Lake Constance, where he died in 1974, aged 84.

== Sources ==
- P R Reid (2011). Colditz: The Full Story. Pan Military Classics. London, England: Pan Macmillan. ISBN 9780330539197.
- Reinhold Eggers (1961). Colditz: The German Story. Barnsley, England: Barnsley: Pen and Sword Military. ISBN 1844155366.
- Reinhold Eggers (1961) Colditz - The German Side of the Story (edited and translated by Howard Gee) New York: W. W. Norton & Company (version available on archive.org)
- Reinhold Eggers; John Watton, eds. (1991). Escape from Colditz: 16 First-Hand Accounts (Revised, illustrated ed.). Hale. ISBN 9780709043522.
