= Ernst Bergmann =

Ernst Bergmann may refer to:

- Ernst David Bergmann (1903–1975), father of the Israeli nuclear program
- Ernst Bergmann (philosopher) (1881–1945), German philosopher and supporter of Nazism
- Ernst von Bergmann (1836–1907), German surgeon
