= Wolfgang Wodarg =

German physician and politician

Wolfgang Wodarg MdB a. D.

Member of the Bundestag for Schleswig-Holstein
- In office 26 October 1998 – 27 October 2009
- Preceded by: Wolfgang Börnsen
- Succeeded by: Wolfgang Börnsen
- Constituency: Flensburg – Schleswig
- In office 10 November 1994 – 26 October 1998
- Preceded by: multi-member district
- Succeeded by: multi-member district
- Constituency: Social Democratic Party List

Head of the Flensburg Health Department
- In office 1981–1994
- Deputy: Gert Postel (Note: From September 1982 to March 1983.)

Personal details
- Born: 2 March 1947 (age 79) Itzehoe, Allied-occupied Germany
- Party: dieBasis (2021–)
- Other political affiliations: Social Democratic Party (1988–2021)
- Education: University of Hamburg
- Occupation: Politician; Physician; Academic; Author
- Website: Official website

Wolfgang Wodarg (born 2 March 1947) is a German physician and politician. He was a member of the Bundestag for the SPD from 1994 to 2009.

As chair of the Parliamentary Assembly of the Council of Europe Health Committee Wodarg co-signed a proposed resolution on 18 December 2009, which was briefly discussed in January 2010 in an emergency debate and he has called for an inquiry into alleged undue influence exerted by pharmaceutical companies on the World Health Organization’s global H1N1 flu campaign.

== Education and profession ==
Born and raised in the town Itzehoe in Schleswig-Holstein, in 1966 Wodarg went, after his secondary school exams, on to study in medicine in Berlin and Hamburg. He got his physician's licence in 1973, and in 1974 he received his Dr. med. doctorate degree from the University of Hamburg with a dissertation on the Mental Diseases of Seafarers – a study of suicide, alcoholism and other major psychiatric disorders. He subsequently began work as a ship's doctor, and following a research trip to South Africa he began in the position of port doctor in Hamburg. Since 1983 he has held the position of Amtsarzt at the health department of Flensburg, of which he became director in the same decade. Wolfgang Wodarg is a lecturer at the University of Flensburg.

== Party affiliation ==
Wodarg is member of the party Die Basis. He has been member of the Social Democratic Party (SPD) from 1988 until 2021. From 1992 to 2002 he was the head of the SPD's Schleswig-Flensburg district. From 19 November 2005 to 1 December 2007 Wodarg was chairman of the SPD district of Flensburg.

Since 1990 Wodarg has been member of the executive committee of the national Association of Social Democrats in the Health Sector, and since 1994 the federal deputy chairman, and in 2002 he became elected chairman of the federal Committee.

== Gert Postel case ==
Wodarg first came to the attention of the general public in the 1980s when he was head of the Public Health Department (German: Gesundheitsamt) in Flensburg, Germany and hired the medical impostor Gert Postel as deputy head, later famously revealed to be a postman by training. This caused controversy, though he retained his position until elected to the Bundestag. He later appeared in the documentary Der Hochstapler – Die schwindelerregende Karriere des Postboten Gert Postel.

== Member of parliament ==
From 1986 to 1998 Wodarg belonged to the parish council of his native Nieby.

From 1994 to 2009 he was a member of the Bundestag. Here Wodarg was spokesman from 2003 to 2005 of the SPD caucus in the inquiry commission ethics and law of modern medicine and spokesman for issues of minorities in the German-Danish border area.

He was a representative for the directly elected Bundestag seat for the Flensburg-Schleswig constituency from 1994 but lost his mandate in the 2009 German federal election.

Since 1999 Wodarg has also belonged to the Parliamentary Assembly of the Council of Europe. Since 2002 he has been vice chairman of the Socialist Group, and since 2006 president of the German social democrats and deputy head of the German delegation.

== COVID-19 pandemic ==
Wodarg gained notoriety during public discussion of the COVID-19 pandemic when he argued that SARS-CoV-2 was only one of many similar viruses which usually go undetected as part of an ordinary seasonal period of respiratory infections, and that the worldwide activities to stop the pandemic were "hype" caused by the selective perception of researchers.

His comments on the COVID-19 pandemic drew criticism from German scientists and some German media outlets. According to the critics, Wodarg's claims largely contradicted the verifiable facts; some of his statements were neither verifiable nor falsifiable; and because the facts Wodarg presented had nothing to do with each other, his statements had proved to be misleading.

In a December 2020 petition to the European Medicines Agency, Wodarg and former Pfizer scientist Michael Yeadon called for all mRNA vaccine trials to be halted. Their petition, which suggested without evidence that the vaccines could cause infertility in women by targeting the syncytin-1 protein necessary for placenta formation, soon began circulating on social media. The misinformation caused by the petition spread from social media into doctors offices, where concerned women began asking their gynecologists if it was true. A survey by the Kaiser Family Foundation in January found that 13% of unvaccinated people in the U.S. had heard that COVID-19 vaccines caused infertility. David Gorski wrote on Science-Based Medicine that Wodarg and Yeadon were "stoking real fear that the new COVID-19 vaccines will make women infertile and [...] doing it based on speculative nonsense".

Transparency International Germany, on whose board of directors Wodarg serves, distanced itself from his statements on 17 March 2020: "Transparency International Germany rejects board member Dr Wolfgang Wodarg's sweeping criticism of the government measures to protect the population from the coronavirus. (...) Wolfgang Wodarg is speaking on this matter as a private individual and not in his capacity as a member of the Management Board." On 25 March 2020, the board decided to suspend his membership in the association "until further notice", which means that Wodarg can no longer exercise any functions on the board or as head of the health working group for the time being. The Board of Directors will commission an independent committee to look into Wodarg's statements about the coronavirus and to determine whether his behaviour has harmed the interests of Transparency International Germany. Transparency Chairman Hartmut Bäumer said that the reason for this was that Wodarg had expressed his views on "radical media" such as KenFM, Rubikon, Geolitico, and in an interview with Eva Herman; all of "which regularly work with conspiracy theories, with anti-democratic and sometimes anti-Semitic prejudices" and "oppose the basic democratic principles of Transparency"; while "some of them are personally close to the AfD".
