= Flensburg – Schleswig =

Federal electoral district of Germany

Coordinates: 54°37′55″N 9°30′35″E

1 Flensburg – Schleswig
- Electoral district for the Bundestag
- Flensburg – Schleswig in 2025
- State: Schleswig-Holstein
- Population: 219,300 (2019)
- Electorate: 231,536 (2021)
- Major settlements: Flensburg; Schleswig
- Area: 2,124.3 km^{2}

Current electoral district
- Created: 1976
- Party: CDU
- Member: Vacant
- Elected: 2025

Flensburg – Schleswig is an electoral constituency (German: Wahlkreis) represented in the Bundestag. It elects one member via first-past-the-post voting. Under the current constituency numbering system, it is designated as constituency 1. It is located in northeastern Schleswig-Holstein, comprising the city of Flensburg and the Schleswig-Flensburg district.

Flensburg – Schleswig was created for the 1976 federal election. From 2021 to 2025, it was represented by Robert Habeck of the Alliance 90/The Greens. In 2025 it was won by Petra Nicolaisen of the CDU, but is still vacant.

== Geography ==
Flensburg – Schleswig is located in northeastern Schleswig-Holstein. As of the 2021 federal election, it comprises the urban district of Flensburg and the district of Schleswig-Flensburg.

== History ==
Flensburg – Schleswig was created in 1976 and contained parts of the abolished constituencies of Flensburg and Schleswig – Eckernförde. Its borders and constituency number have not changed since its creation.

== Members ==
The constituency was held by the Social Democratic Party (SPD) from its creation in 1976 until 1983, during which time it was represented by Egon Bahr. It was won by the Christian Democratic Union (CDU) in 1983, and represented by Harm Dallmeyer (until 1987) and Wolfgang Börnsen. In 1998, it was won by the SPD's Wolfgang Wodarg. Former member Börnsen won the constituency again in 2009, and represented it until 2013. He was succeeded by Sabine Sütterlin-Waack, who served until 2017, and then by Petra Nicolaisen. Robert Habeck of the Greens won the constituency in the 2021 election.

Election	Member	Party	%
1976	Egon Bahr	SPD	49.0
1980	Egon Bahr	SPD	49.7
1983	Harm Dallmeyer	CDU	49.7
1987	Wolfgang Börnsen	CDU	46.0
1990	Wolfgang Börnsen	CDU	47.2
1994	Wolfgang Börnsen	CDU	45.6
1998	Wolfgang Wodarg	SPD	50.2
2002	Wolfgang Wodarg	SPD	44.2
2005	Wolfgang Wodarg	SPD	44.2
2009	Wolfgang Börnsen	CDU	38.8
2013	Sabine Sütterlin-Waack	CDU	42.5
2017	Petra Nicolaisen	CDU	40.0
2021	Robert Habeck	GRÜNE	28.1
2025	Vacant (Note: Petra Nicolaisen (CDU) won with 26.5% but seat remained vacant due to insufficient second votes cover.)		

== Election results ==
=== 2025 election ===
Federal election (2025): Flensburg – Schleswig
Notes:	Blue background denotes the winner of the electorate vote. Pink background denotes a candidate elected from their party list. Yellow background denotes an electorate win by a list member, or other incumbent. A ✓ or ✗ denotes status of any incumbent, win or lose respectively.						
Party	Candidate	Votes	%	±%	Party votes	%	±%
CDU	Petra Nicolaisen	50,822	26.5	▲3.1	47,683	24.9	▲4.5
Greens	✗ Robert Habeck	43,290	22.6	▼5.6	30,590	15.9	▼2.7
SPD	Johanna Selbert	28,366	14.8	▼7.0	30,544	15.9	▼9.6
AfD	Martin Neubauer	28,824	15.0	▲9.6	29,267	15.3	▲9.5
SSW	Stefan Seidler	21,465	11.2	▲3.9	20,573	10.7	▲1.5
Left	Lorenz Gösta Beutin	10,370	5.4	▲1.7	15,894	8.3	▲4.1
FDP	Christoph Anastasiadis	4,484	2.3	▼4.5	7,065	3.7	▼7.1
BSW					6,045	3.2	New
Volt	Christian Schweckendieck	1,451	0.8	New	1,450	0.8	▲0.5
PARTEI					1,210	0.6	▼0.4
FW	Arne Jöhnk	1,544	0.8	▼0.5	1,136	0.6	▼0.4
Independent	Uwe Krüger-Winands	470	0.2	New			
BD	Stefan Andresen	646	0.3	New	329	0.2	New
MLPD					53	<0.1	0.0
Informal votes		1,134			1,027		
Total valid votes		191,732			191,839		
Turnout		192,866	83.1	▲5.3			
CDU gain from Greens	Majority	7,532	3.9	N/A			

=== 2021 election ===
Federal election (2021): Flensburg – Schleswig
Notes:	Blue background denotes the winner of the electorate vote. Pink background denotes a candidate elected from their party list. Yellow background denotes an electorate win by a list member, or other incumbent. A ✓ or ✗ denotes status of any incumbent, win or lose respectively.						
Party	Candidate	Votes	%	±%	Party votes	%	±%
Greens	Robert Habeck	50,231	28.1	▲17.6	33,300	18.6	▲5.6
CDU	✗ Petra Nicolaisen	41,721	23.4	▼16.6	36,421	20.4	▼13.8
SPD	Franziska Brzezicha	38,927	21.8	▼6.2	45,508	25.5	▲1.8
SSW	Stefan Seidler	13,020	7.3		16,415	9.2	
FDP	Christoph Anastasiadis	12,299	6.9	▲0.3	19,189	10.7	▼0.4
AfD	Jan Petersen-Brendel	9,768	5.5	▼0.7	10,317	5.8	▼1.1
Left	Katrine Hoop	6,544	3.7	▼3.5	7,475	4.2	▼4.0
dieBasis	Marko Wölbing	3,356	1.9		2,866	1.6	
Tierschutzpartei					1,990	1.1	
PARTEI					1,844	1.0	▼0.2
FW	Arne Olaf Jöhnk	2,324	1.3	▲0.2	1,715	1.0	▲0.3
Volt					403	0.2	
Team Todenhöfer					318	0.2	
V-Partei3					194	0.1	
Humanists					157	0.1	
NPD					138	0.1	▼0.1
ÖDP					132	0.1	▼0.1
du.	Dariush Keshavarz Khorasgani	227	0.1		118	0.1	
LKR	Uwe Christiansen	157	0.1		73	0.0	
DKP					40	0.0	
MLPD					12	0.0	0.0
Informal votes		1,537			1,487		
Total valid votes		178,575			178,625		
Turnout		180,112	77.8	▲2.5			
Greens gain from CDU	Majority	8,510	4.7				

=== 2017 election ===
Federal election (2017): Flensburg – Schleswig
Notes:	Blue background denotes the winner of the electorate vote. Pink background denotes a candidate elected from their party list. Yellow background denotes an electorate win by a list member, or other incumbent. A ✓ or ✗ denotes status of any incumbent, win or lose respectively.						
Party	Candidate	Votes	%	±%	Party votes	%	±%
CDU	Petra Nicolaisen	68,120	40.0	▼2.5	58,320	34.2	▼4.0
SPD	Clemens Teschendorf	47,711	28.0	▼9.2	40,388	23.7	▼8.9
Greens	Peter Wittenhorst	17,911	10.5	▲2.7	22,304	13.1	▲3.3
FDP	Christian Lucks	11,147	6.5	▲4.7	18,955	11.1	▲6.1
Left	Hermann Soldan	12,144	7.1	▲2.5	14,002	8.2	▲2.6
AfD	Frank Hansen	10,583	6.2	▲3.0	11,653	6.8	▲2.8
PARTEI					2,100	1.2	
FW	Arne-Olaf Jöhnk	1,947	1.1		1,195	0.7	▲0.1
BGE					843	0.5	
Independent	Uwe Krüger-Winands	755	0.4				
NPD					349	0.2	▼0.4
MLPD					59	0.0	0.0
Informal votes		1,596			1,449		
Total valid votes		170,318			170,465		
Turnout		171,914	75.2	▲3.5			
CDU hold	Majority	20,409	12.0	▲6.7			

=== 2013 election ===
Federal election (2013): Flensburg – Schleswig
Notes:	Blue background denotes the winner of the electorate vote. Pink background denotes a candidate elected from their party list. Yellow background denotes an electorate win by a list member, or other incumbent. A ✓ or ✗ denotes status of any incumbent, win or lose respectively.						
Party	Candidate	Votes	%	±%	Party votes	%	±%
CDU	Sabine Sütterlin-Waack	68,235	42.5	▲3.7	61,347	38.2	▲6.1
SPD	Dirk Peddinghaus	59,718	37.2	▲4.5	52,396	32.6	▲6.4
Greens	Marlene Löhr	12,491	7.8	▼2.5	15,734	9.8	▼4.0
Left	Heinz-Werner Jezewski	7,436	4.6	▼2.9	9,084	5.7	▼2.8
AfD	Hans Ulrich Post	5,234	3.3		6,563	4.1	
Pirates	Nadine Lindenberg	3,418	2.1		3,183	2.0	▼0.1
FDP	Carsten-Peter Brodersen	3,039	1.9	▼7.7	8,065	5.0	▼10.2
Tierschutzpartei					1,459	0.9	
FW					1,042	0.6	
NPD	Wolfgang Schimmel	955	0.6	▼0.2	929	0.6	▼0.2
BGE					843	0.5	
Rentner					790	0.5	▼0.7
MLPD					44	0.0	0.0
Informal votes		2,223			2,113		
Total valid votes		160,526			160,636		
Turnout		162,749	71.7	▼0.8			
CDU hold	Majority	8,517	5.3	▼0.8			

=== 2009 election ===
Federal election (2009): Flensburg – Schleswig
Notes:	Blue background denotes the winner of the electorate vote. Pink background denotes a candidate elected from their party list. Yellow background denotes an electorate win by a list member, or other incumbent. A ✓ or ✗ denotes status of any incumbent, win or lose respectively.						
Party	Candidate	Votes	%	±%	Party votes	%	±%
CDU	Wolfgang Börnsen	61,793	38.8	▼5.2	51,068	32.1	▼4.3
SPD	✗ Wolfgang Wodarg	52,139	32.7	▼11.5	41,793	26.3	▼12.8
Greens	Ingrid Nestle	16,399	10.3	▲6.1	21,967	13.8	▲5.8
FDP	Jörg Petersen	15,292	9.6	▲6.4	24,187	15.2	▲5.5
Left	Heinz-Werner Jezewski	11,918	7.5	▲3.8	13,481	8.5	▲3.7
Pirates					3,385	2.1	
Rentner					1,821	1.1	
NPD	Kevin Stein	1,302	0.8	0.0	1,240	0.8	0.0
Centre	Hans-Werner Jarmer	369	0.2				
DVU					159	0.1	
MLPD					47	0.0	0.0
Informal votes		4,117			4,181		
Total valid votes		159,212			159,148		
Turnout		163,329	72.5	▼5.2			
CDU gain from SPD	Majority	9,654	6.1				

=== 2005 election ===
Federal election (2005): Flensburg – Schleswig
Notes:	Blue background denotes the winner of the electorate vote. Pink background denotes a candidate elected from their party list. Yellow background denotes an electorate win by a list member, or other incumbent. A ✓ or ✗ denotes status of any incumbent, win or lose respectively.						
Party	Candidate	Votes	%	±%	Party votes	%	±%
SPD	✓ Wolfgang Wodarg	74,802	44.2	▼4.4	66,099	39.1	▼5.0
CDU	Wolfgang Börnsen	74,480	44.0	▲2.7	61,535	36.4	▼0.1
Greens	Grietje Bettin	7,068	4.2	▼0.2	13,597	8.0	▼1.1
Left	Meenhard Smit	6,150	3.6	▲2.5	8,120	4.8	▲3.5
FDP	Jörg Petersen	5,347	3.2	▼1.0	16,397	9.7	▲2.2
Familie					2,025	1.2	
NPD	Artur Nissen	1,306	0.8		1,359	0.8	▲0.6
MLPD					99	0.1	
Informal votes		2,674			2,596		
Total valid votes		169,153			169,231		
Turnout		171,827	77.8	▼1.2			
SPD hold	Majority	322	0.2	▼7.1			

=== 2002 election ===
Federal election (2002): Flensburg – Schleswig
Notes:	Blue background denotes the winner of the electorate vote. Pink background denotes a candidate elected from their party list. Yellow background denotes an electorate win by a list member, or other incumbent. A ✓ or ✗ denotes status of any incumbent, win or lose respectively.						
Party	Candidate	Votes	%	±%	Party votes	%	±%
SPD	✓ Wolfgang Wodarg	82,845	48.7	▼1.5	74,934	44.0	▼3.2
CDU	Wolfgang Börnsen	70,366	41.3	▼1.0	62,000	36.4	▲1.1
Greens	Grietje Staffelt	7,440	4.4	▲1.1	15,544	9.1	▲2.8
FDP	Broder Schwensen	7,052	4.1	▲2.3	12,688	7.5	▲0.9
PDS	Rainer Bachmann	1,930	1.1	▲0.1	2,198	1.3	0.0
Schill					1,382	0.8	New
PBC	Arnim Häbel	588	0.3	▲0.2	457	0.3	0.0
GRAUEN					468	0.3	0.0
Die Heimat					323	0.2	▲0.1
REP					247	0.1	▼0.2
Informal votes		1,635			1,615		
Total valid votes		170,221			170,341		
Turnout		170,221	78.9	▼2.1			
SPD hold	Majority	12,479	7.4	N/A			
