= Doktorspiele =

Doktorspiele is the German word for "playing doctor".

Doktorspiele may also refer to:

- Playing Doctor (film) (German: Doktorspiele), a 2014 German comedy film by Marco Petry
- "Doktorspiele", a 2008 single by Alex Christensen and Yasmin K.
- Doktorspiele, a 2001 book by Gert Postel
- "Doktorspiele", a 2003 Um Himmels Willen episode
