= Robert Habeck =

German former politician (born 1969)

- Habeck at the Frankfurt Book Fair in 2026

Vice Chancellor of Germany
- In office 8 December 2021 – 6 May 2025
- Chancellor: Olaf Scholz
- Preceded by: Olaf Scholz
- Succeeded by: Lars Klingbeil

Minister for Economic Affairs and Climate Action
- In office 8 December 2021 – 6 May 2025
- Chancellor: Olaf Scholz
- Preceded by: Peter Altmaier
- Succeeded by: Katherina Reiche

Leader of Alliance 90/The Greens
- In office 27 January 2018 – 29 January 2022 Serving with Annalena Baerbock
- Deputy: Gesine Agena; Ricarda Lang; Jamila Schäfer
- Preceded by: Cem Özdemir
- Succeeded by: Omid Nouripour

Deputy Minister-President of Schleswig-Holstein
- In office 12 June 2012 – 6 February 2018
- Minister-President: Torsten Albig; Daniel Günther
- Preceded by: Heiner Garg
- Succeeded by: Monika Heinold

Minister for Energy Transition, Agriculture, the Environment, Nature and Digitization of Schleswig-Holstein
- In office 12 June 2012 – 31 August 2018
- Minister-President: Torsten Albig; Daniel Günther
- Preceded by: Juliane Rumpf
- Succeeded by: Jan Philipp Albrecht

Leader of Alliance 90/The Greens in the Landtag of Schleswig-Holstein
- In office 27 October 2009 – 12 June 2012
- Preceded by: Karl-Martin Hentschel
- Succeeded by: Eka von Kalben
Parliamentary constituencies
Member of the Bundestag for Flensburg – Schleswig
In office 26 October 2021 – 1 September 2025
Preceded by	Petra Nicolaisen
Succeeded by	Mayra Vriesema
Member of the Bundesrat for Schleswig-Holstein
In office 12 June 2012 – 6 February 2018
Preceded by	Heiner Garg
Succeeded by	Monika Heinold
Member of the Landtag of Schleswig-Holstein
In office 27 October 2009 – 12 June 2012
Preceded by	multi-member district
Succeeded by	Detlef Matthiessen
Constituency	Alliance 90/The Greens List

Personal details
- Born: 2 September 1969 (age 57) Lübeck, Schleswig-Holstein, West Germany
- Party: Alliance 90/The Greens
- Spouse: Andrea Paluch (m. 1996)
- Children: 4
- Education: University of Freiburg; Roskilde University; University of Hamburg (MA, Dr. phil.)
- Occupation: Politician; writer
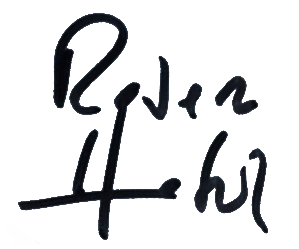
- Signature
- Website: www.robert-habeck.de

Robert Habeck (German: [ˈʁoːbɛʁt ˈhaːbɛk]; born 2 September 1969) is a German writer and former politician (Alliance 90/The Greens) who served as Vice Chancellor of Germany, Federal Minister for Economic Affairs and Climate Action in the cabinet of Chancellor Olaf Scholz and as a Member of the German Bundestag for Flensburg – Schleswig from 2021 to 2025. From 2018 to 2022, he also served as co-leader of Alliance 90/The Greens, alongside Annalena Baerbock. For the 2021 German federal election, he was a member of the leading duo, alongside Baerbock, who ran for chancellor of Germany.

Between 2009 and 2012, Habeck was a member of the state parliament of Schleswig-Holstein, where he was also the Greens' parliamentary leader. From 2012 to 2018 he served as the state's Deputy Minister-president and Minister for Energy Transition, Agriculture, the Environment, Nature and Digitization, and a member of the Bundesrat.

Habeck was the Green's candidate for chancellor in the 2025 federal elections. Later in 2025, he resigned his Bundestag seat and retired from politics.

== Early life, education and writing ==
Habeck passed his final secondary school examinations in 1989 at the Heinrich Heine School in Heikendorf in the Plön district. After completing his alternative civilian service in 1991 he began studying for a master's degree with a combination of philosophy, German and philology at the Albert Ludwigs University in Freiburg im Breisgau. After the intermediate examination in 1992/93 he attended Roskilde University in Denmark. In 1996 Habeck received a master's degree from the University of Hamburg. From 1996 to 1998 he completed a doctorate at the University of Hamburg and was awarded a doctorate in philosophy in 2000, with a thesis on the depiction of nature in literature.

From 1999 Habeck and his wife Andrea Paluch worked as freelance writers. In addition to children's books and translations of English poetry, Habeck, with Paluch, published six novels, among others, Hauke Haien's Death (2001), The Day I Met My Dead Man (2005) and Under the Gully Lies the Sea (2007). Habeck is fluent in Danish.

== State politics ==
In 2009, Habeck was elected to the Schleswig-Holstein Landtag via the party list. In November 2011, he was voted as the top candidate of his party for the 2012 Schleswig-Holstein election. From 2009 to 2012, Habeck was chairman of the Alliance 90/The Greens group in Schleswig-Holstein.

Habeck served as Deputy Minister-President and State Minister for Energy, Agriculture, Environment and Rural Areas in the centre-left Albig Cabinet since 2012 and in the centre-right Günther Cabinet between 2017 and 2018. Under his leadership – he was not a candidate for parliament – the Green Party became the third largest group in the Landtag after the 2017 state elections. As one of his state's representatives at the Bundesrat, he served on the Committee on Agricultural Policy and Consumer Protection; the Committee on the Environment, Nature Protection and Reactor Safety; the Committee on Economic Affairs; and the Committee on Transport. From 2014 and 2016, Habeck was one of the members of Germany's temporary National Commission on the Disposal of Radioactive Waste.

Habeck served as a Green Party delegate to the Federal Convention for the purpose of electing the President of Germany in 2012. He ran to become one of the two top candidates for the Greens for the 2017 German federal election, but lost by 75 votes to Cem Özdemir.

== National politics ==
On 27 January 2018, the Green Party's national convention in Hanover elected him as chairman, a position shared with Annalena Baerbock. He then resigned from his ministerial posts in Schleswig-Holstein.

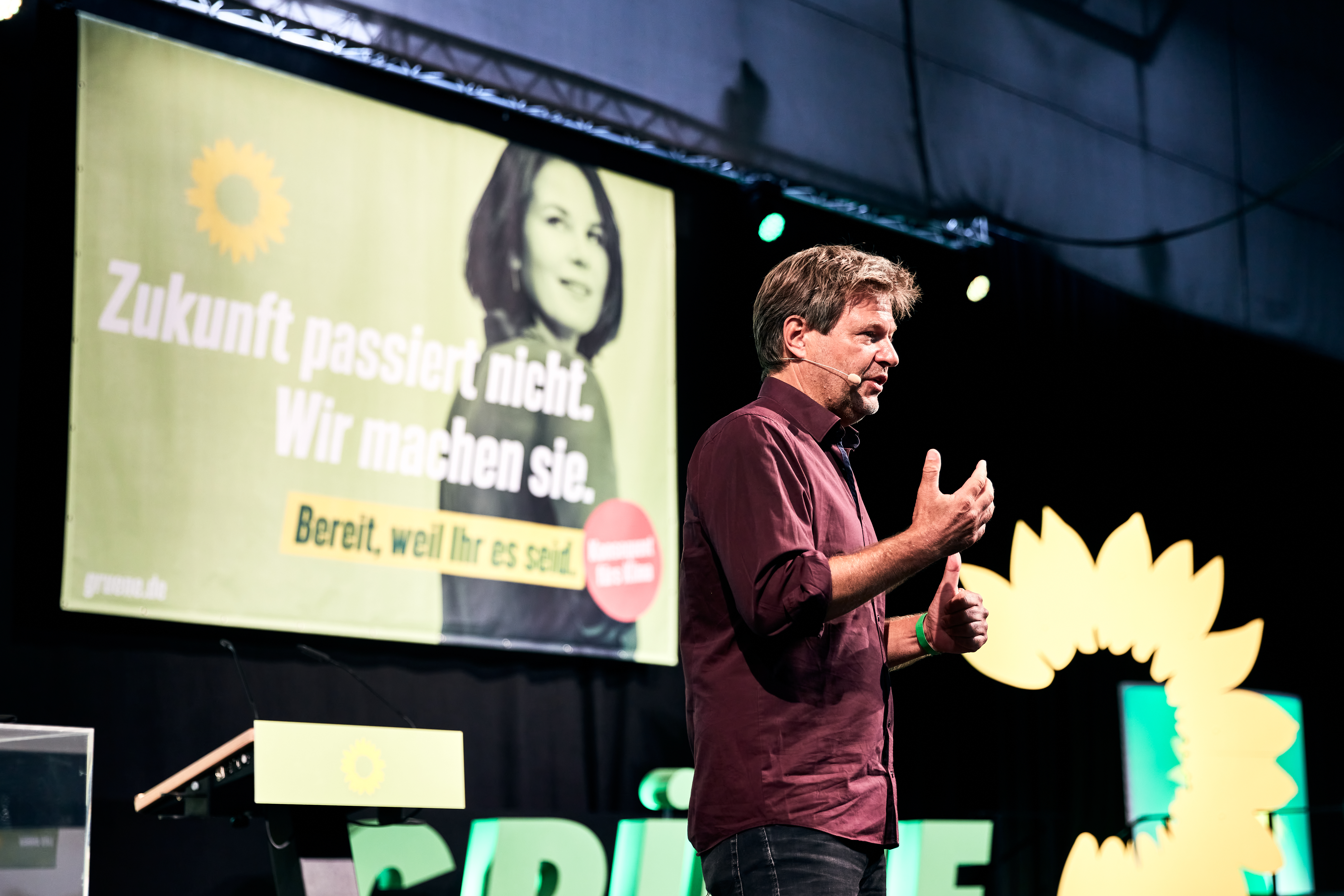
Habeck in Dortmund in August 2021

Habeck was elected to the Bundestag in the 2021 German federal election, defeating the CDU incumbent Petra Nicolaisen in the constituency of Flensburg – Schleswig.

=== Vice Chancellor and Minister for Economic Affairs, 2021–2025 ===
After the Greens agreed to form a traffic light coalition government with the centre-left Social Democrats and liberal Free Democrats, new Chancellor Olaf Scholz named Habeck as Minister for Economic Affairs and Climate Action and vice chancellor in December 2021.

==== Energy policy ====
In January 2022 Habeck, an opponent of nuclear energy, pushed against efforts at the EU level to label it as a green energy source. In March, Habeck's ministry ruled out extending the life of Germany's remaining nuclear power plants, arguing that the costs involved outweighed the benefits. Critics said that nuclear energy was a way to reduce Germany's reliance on Russian gas following Russia's invasion of Ukraine. Later, in April 2024, the magazine Cicero claimed that Habeck had misled the public on this issue. The magazine said he had ignored the advice of experts who said nuclear facilities were still safe to operate.

In March 2022, as the Russia–EU gas dispute intensified, Habeck cautioned, "If we do not obtain more gas next winter and if deliveries from Russia were to be cut then we would not have enough gas to heat all our houses and keep all our industry going". He subsequently signed a deal with Qatar for the supply of liquefied natural gas, saying "although we might still need Russian gas this year, in the future it won't be so any more." He said that Germany planned to end imports of Russian natural gas completely by mid-2024.

In April, Habeck presented a package of measures to both reduce reliance on Russian gas imports and speed up Germany's transition to renewable energy. In May, he said that the end of Russian gas imports would permanently raise energy prices in Germany.

In June, Habeck warned that Germany was facing a "more significant" energy crisis than the 1973 oil crisis. After EU leaders announced joint climate measures later that month, Habeck called it "one of the most comprehensive climate packages in EU history" achieved "in the middle of Europe's biggest energy crisis."

In September, with energy-intensive German industry still struggling with rising energy prices, Habeck presented a €200 billion plan to shield producers and consumers from some of the effects. He also announced plans to keep two of Germany's three remaining nuclear power stations on standby, beyond a year-end deadline to ditch the fuel, to ensure enough electricity supply through the winter. Habeck also accused the United States and other "friendly" gas supplier nations of profiting from the Ukraine war with "astronomical prices". He called for Washington to show solidarity with its allies in Europe by reducing prices.

The last three nuclear power plants in Germany were shut down on 15 April 2023.

In July 2023, Habeck stated that the German transition to green energy would "put a burden on people" and there was "a major transformational period ahead of us until 2030". He called for a phase-out of coal by 2030.

In November 2023, Habeck led efforts on backstopping Siemens Energy with guarantees worth €7.5 billion ($8.1 billion) as part of a deal with other stakeholders to help the energy company fulfil its order book; the guarantees were part of a package totaling €15 billion agreed with private banks and other stakeholders and also imposed a pause on dividends and higher level bonuses.

In January 2024, he became the target of protests by German farmers for his role in promoting green policies and pushing for cuts in agricultural subsidies.

In September 2024, in response to the threat of mass layoffs at the Volkswagen car manufacturer, Habeck said that the government would consider how it could help Volkswagen. He said that the government should support the transition to electric cars.

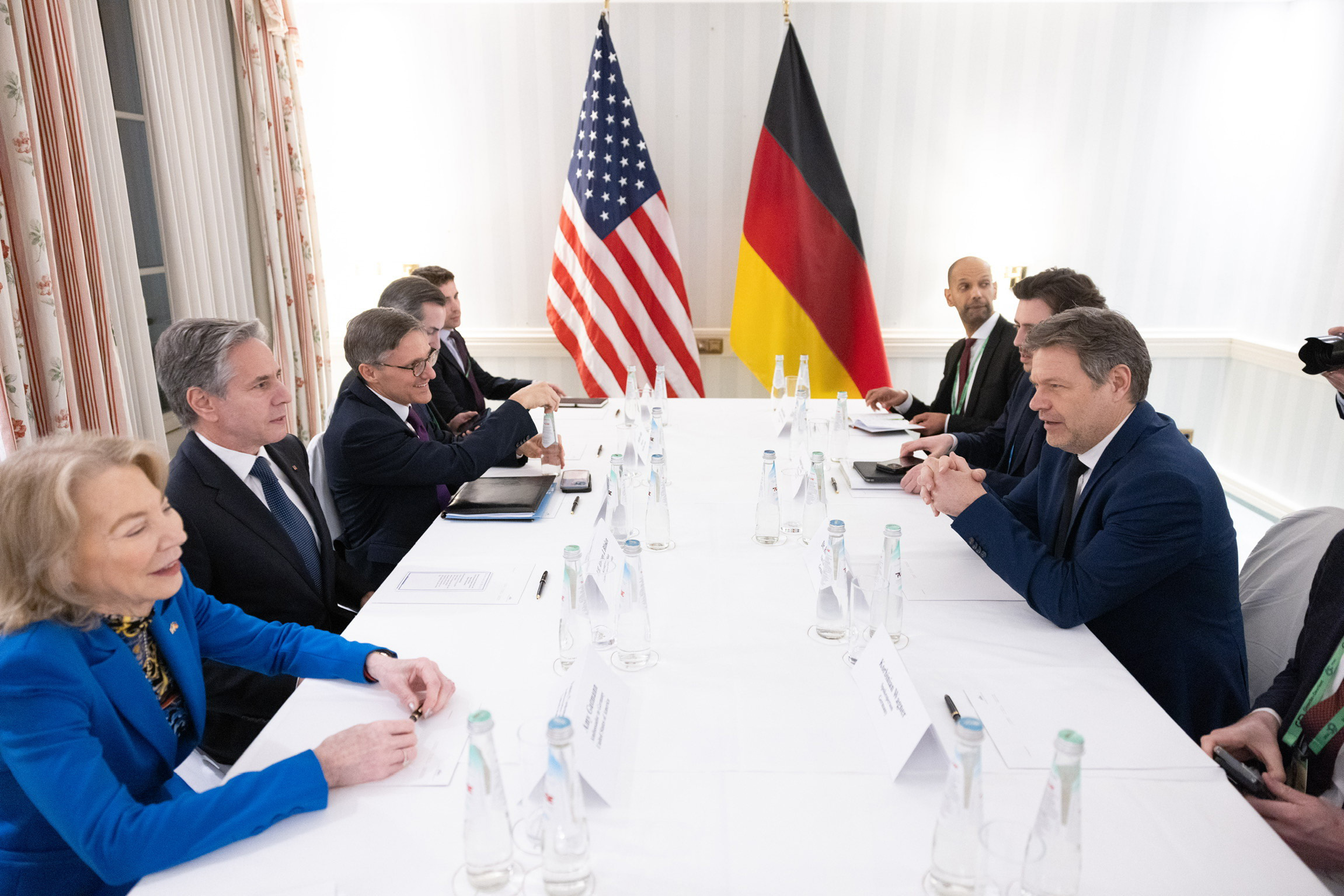
Habeck with US Secretary of State Antony Blinken, 16 February 2024

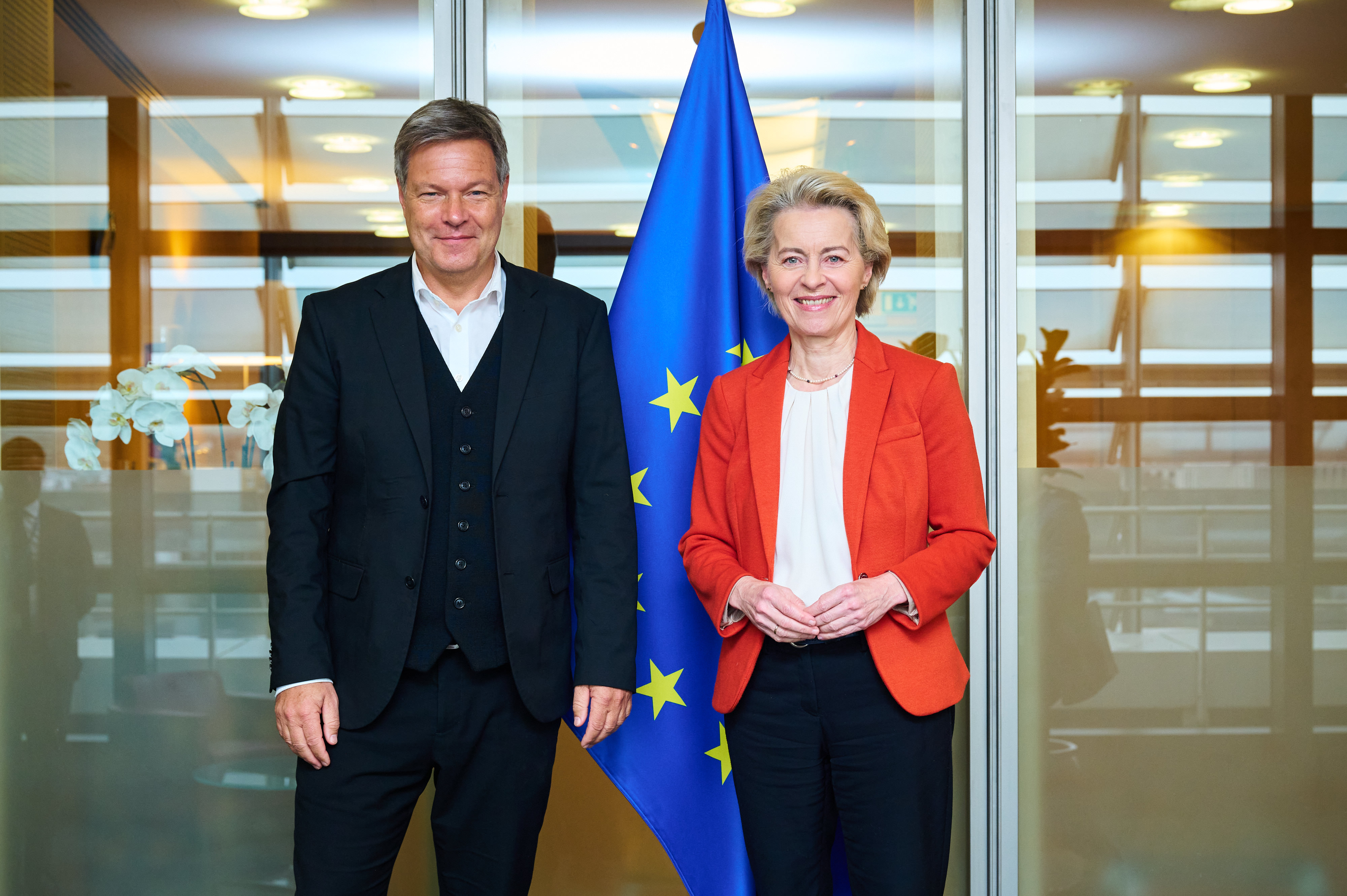
Habeck with European Commission President Ursula von der Leyen, 21 November 2024

==== Foreign investments and trade ====
Under Habeck's leadership, the ministry stopped Beijing-based Aeonmed Group in April 2022 from purchasing German medical device manufacturer Heyer Medical, based on a government assessment that there were dangers to public safety. In November 2022, he formally blocked Silex, a Swedish subsidiary of China's Sai Microelectronics, from buying a Elmos Semiconductor plant for €85 million, saying the country had to protect key industries from potential security threats.

In September 2022, Habeck confirmed that Germany approved new arms export deals to Saudi Arabia, despite the ban imposed as a result of the Saudi Arabian–led intervention in Yemen.

Habeck voiced support for the European Union–Mercosur free trade agreement, saying the agreement would be "an opportunity for South America as well as for Europe and for Germany".

In March 2023, Habeck participated in the first joint cabinet meeting of the governments of Germany and Japan in Tokyo, chaired by Chancellor Scholz and Prime Minister Fumio Kishida.

=== 2024 German government crisis ===
In November 2024, two days after the FDP left the coalition due to the ongoing political crisis, which subsequently became a minority government and the Scholz cabinet was reshuffled, Habeck announced that he wanted to be nominated by the Greens as candidate for chancellor for the federal election. At the party conference on 17 November 2024, he was officially elected as candidate for chancellor by the Greens' delegates.

However, in the election, the Greens received only 11.6% of the vote, down from 14.7% the previous time, and were not part of the subsequent coalition government. Habeck lost his seat in the electoral district of Flensburg – Schleswig, but still entered the Bundestag through the state list.

In August 2025, after fives months in the new Bundestag, Habeck announced he was retiring from politics and would become an academic. He officially resigned his Bundestag seat on 1 September, and was succeeded by Mayra Vriesema.

== Political positions ==
In March 2024 Habeck said:

We cannot rely on the Americans to always foot the bill for everything or to provide the necessary materials. That means that ramping up military production, the defense and armaments industries, and scenarios including for national defense — these all need to be reactivated again.

In an interview in 2018 Habeck positioned himself against an ethnic notion of nationhood, which he differentiated from the notion of a "constitutive people".

In November 2020, Habeck and fellow party members Konstantin von Notz and Irene Mihalic published an "11-point plan against Islamist terrorism". Among the proposals were more resources for the surveillance of individuals who had not committed crimes but police had identified as potential security threats (Gefährder), and the prohbition of certain Salafist groups.

In 2021, Habeck warned against "accept[ing] the demands of identity politics uncritically".

=== COVID-19 pandemic ===
In an interview with Der Tagesspiegel at the end of May 2020, Habeck said that the COVID-19 pandemic was "maybe the first time" that health care was more important than economic growth. He called for public funding which had been mobilised to provide relief during the crisis to also be applied to rejuvenate the economy and address the climate crisis.

On 6 May 2021, Habeck demanded the federal government waive patent rights for the COVID-19 vaccine.

=== Migration & refugees ===
In December 2019, Habeck called for the evacuation of refugee camps on Greek islands on humanitarian grounds, and said countries including Germany should admit the people detained there. In March 2020 he raised the issue again, highlighting the risk of a COVID-19 outbreak in the camps.

In October 2023, Habeck called for more immigration to Germany, saying the shortage of skilled workers was the country’s "most pressing structural problem". In July 2024, he proposed tax relief for skilled foreign workers.

=== Gaza war ===
On 2 November 2023, Habeck posted a video on X/Twitter about protests in Germany against the Gaza war. He said that burning the Israeli flag or praising Hamas were felony offenses in Germany, and stated: "Germans will have to answer for this in court, while non-Germans also risk losing their residence status. Anyone who does not yet have a residence permit provides a reason to be deported." ("Wer Deutscher ist, wird sich dafür vor Gericht verantworten müssen, wer kein Deutscher ist, riskiert außerdem seinen Aufenthaltsstatus. Wer noch keinen Aufenthaltstitel hat, liefert einen Grund, abgeschoben zu werden.") The video was viewed more than 42 million times in the first two weeks.

On 11 January 2024, while visiting Sderot near the Gaza strip, Habeck called South Africa's case against Israel at the International Court of Justice "one of the biggest absurdities" ("eine der größten Absurditäten") imaginable. He added, "genocide is something else, it is the deliberate will to wipe out ethnic groups or religious communities, the deliberate extermination." ("Aber Völkermord ist etwas anderes, es ist das gezielte Auslöschenwollen von Ethnien oder religiösen Gemeinschaften, das gezielte Auslöschen.")

In May 2024, however, he argued that Israel's actions, especially the Rafah offensive, were "incompatible with international law".

== Post-politics ==
Since 2025, Habeck has been working as analyst of foreign policy and diplomacy at the Danish Institute for International Studies (DIIS). In October 2025, he served as a Distinguished Global Leader at the Perry World House at the University of Pennsylvania, and in January 2026 as a visiting professor at the Hebrew University in Jerusalem; since March 2026, he has been at the Haas School of Business at the University of California, Berkeley. Building on the focus of his political work to date, he intends to address the questions of how the fight for liberal democracy will proceed and what consequences global warming will have, particularly from a security policy perspective.

In 2026, Habeck joined Danish investment firm Urban Partners as senior advisor.

== Other activities ==
- KfW, ex-officio member of the board of supervisors directors (2021–2025)
- RAG-Stiftung, ex-officio member of the board of trustees (2021–2025)

== Personal life ==
Habeck is married with four children. He is a vegetarian. His brother-in-law is fellow politician Stefan Birkner.

His great-grandfather was Walter Granzow, whose son Kurt Granzow, Habeck maternal grandfather, was an Obersturmführer in the SA.
