= Gert Postel =

German impostor (born 1958)

Leitender Oberarzt of the Specialist Hospital in Zschadraß
- In office 1 November 1995 – 10 July 1997
- Chief Physician: Horst Krömker

Deputy Head of the Flensburg Health Department
- In office 15 September 1982 – March 1983
- Head: Wolfgang Wodarg

Personal details
- Born: Gert Uwe Postel; 18 June 1958 (age 68) Bremen, West Germany

Gert Uwe Postel (born June 18, 1958) is a German impostor, best known for successfully applying several times for public health positions as a medical doctor without ever having received medical education.

Gert Postel went to Hauptschule and finished his training as a mail carrier. Postel himself said that his mother died because of a maladministered depression treatment and that he himself had briefly been in a juvenile ward. From these events, he claimed to have gained the motivation to expose and embarrass psychiatry.

== Career as impostor ==
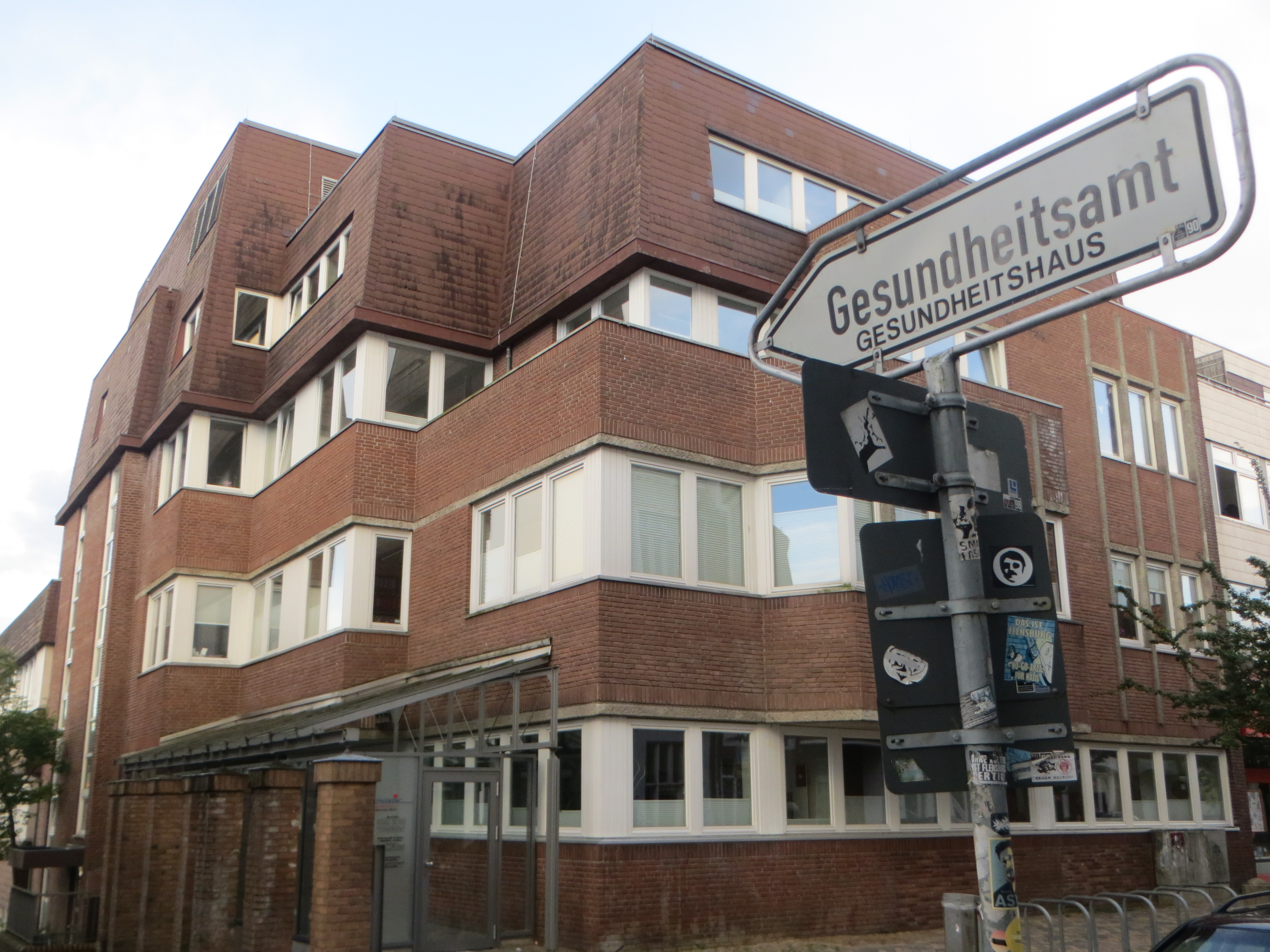
Public health office in Flensburg (2014)

=== Public health officer in Flensburg ===
In September 1982, Postel successfully applied for the position of assistant public health officer in Flensburg using the pseudonym of "Dr. med. Dr. phil. Clemens Bartholdy". His true identity was discovered in April 1983 when he lost an identification card bearing his real name and it was found by someone who knew him by his pseudonym. As a result, Postel had to leave his position in public service. In 1984, he received a suspended sentence and was placed on probation for multiple instances of forgery of documents, unauthorized assumption of academic titles and forgery of health certificates.

During the eighties, by his own account, he lived seven years in a partnership with a judge.

Other employments as a medical doctor followed, e.g. in a private clinic and as a surgeon major with the Bundeswehr.

=== Senior physician at Zschadraß forensic psychiatry ===
After studying theology for a while, Postel returned to medical service in 1995 when he applied under his real name to become senior physician at a psychiatry hospital in Zschadraß after seeing the position advertised in Deutsches Ärzteblatt. Nearly 40 actual physicians and specialists applied for the job. Postel and seven others made the short-list and were asked to present a paper to the Appointment Board of the Ministry for Social Affairs. Postel was hired after preparing and presenting an original lecture entitled 'Pseudologia Phantastica' or 'Compulsive Deception as Enhancement of the Self in Thomas Mann's exemplary figure of Felix Krull'" based on Thomas Mann's Confessions of Felix Krull. When asked about his doctorate, Postel said his thesis was "Cognitive-induced Distortions in the Stereotypical Formation of Judgement" which he characterized as "nothing else than the stringing together of meaningless words."

Postel was selected for the position and held it for 18 months, during which time he received positive performance reviews and was offered a promotion, which he declined. On July 10, 1997, a co-worker recognized him from his earlier fraud in Flensburg, forcing him to go into hiding. At that time, an appointment was already set for an interview with Hans Geisler, then Saxony's Minister of State for social affairs, health and family, on the occasion of Postel's appointment to a professorship and to the position of chief of medicine at Saxony's hospital for psychiatry and neurology at Arnsdorf near Dresden.

=== Imprisonment ===
Gert Postel was arrested on May 12, 1998. At trial, a psychiatric expert testified that Postel had narcissistic personality disorder. In 1999, the state court in Leipzig sentenced him to four years in jail for repeated imposture and forgery of documents. He has said he was diagnosed with narcissistic personality disorder by doctors at Leipzig. Following his probationary release in January 2001, Postel published an account of his experiences, titled "Doktorspiele" (Playing Doctor). Intended to be an exposure of psychiatric establishment, the book made him an idol within the anti-psychiatry movement in Germany.

=== 2002 docudrama ===
In 2002, ARD broadcast an NDR-produced docudrama titled "Der Unwiderstehliche – Die 1000 Lügen des Gert Postel" ("The Irresistible One – The Thousand Lies of Gert Postel"), directed by Kai Christiansen. The film features both re-enacted scenes and footage from an interview with Postel.

In contrast to the broadly sympathising stance towards Postel in the German media—who drew comparisons with the "Captain of Köpenick", Wilhelm Voigt—the film takes a far more critical approach, including themes like narcissism. It also makes mention of Postel's alleged stalking of several women, including a prosecutor investigating his case, and intimidation of a patient in Zschadraß, whom according to her own account Postel had threatened with transferral to a secure unit, for challenging his method of treatment.

== See also ==
- Jean-Claude Romand – French spree killer who pretended to be a medical professional for 18 years
- Waterkant-Gate – German political scandal occurring in 1987
- Sokal affair – Scholarly hoax in which a physics professor successfully submitted a deliberately nonsensical article that "flattered the editors' ideological preconceptions" to a Sociology Journal, casting doubt on the scientific integrity of postmodern cultural studies.
