= Colditz =

- Town
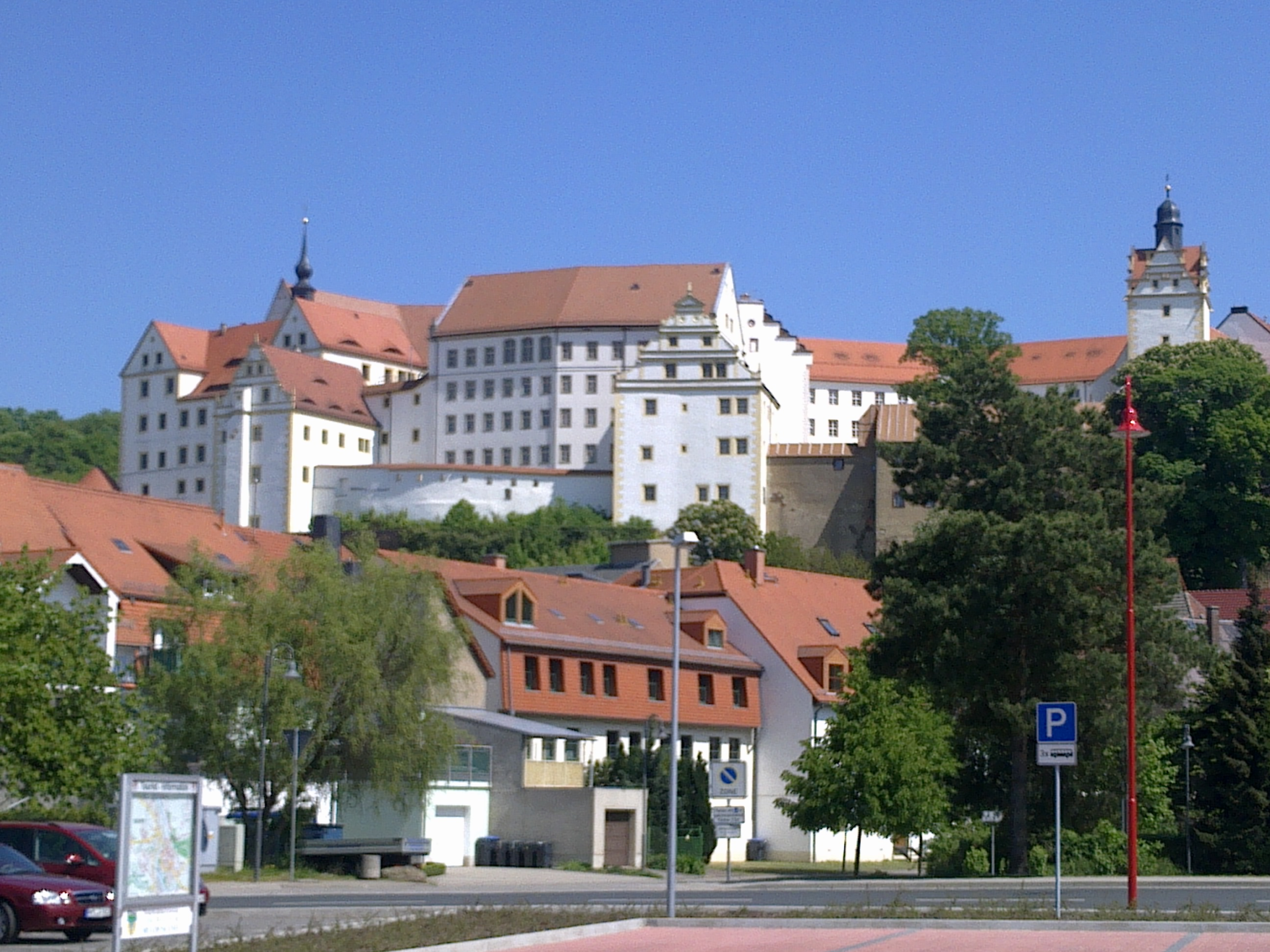
- Town and castle

- Coat of arms

- Location of Colditz within Leipzig district
- Interactive map of Colditz
- Location within Germany Location within Saxony
- Coordinates: 51°07′45″N 12°48′25″E
- Country: Germany
- State: Saxony
- District: Leipzig
- Subdivisions: 4

Government
  - Mayor (2018–25): Robert Zillmann (Ind.)

Area
  - Total: 84.09 km^{2} (32.47 sq mi)
- Elevation: 156 m (512 ft)

Population (2025-12-31)
  - Total: 8,209
  - Density: 97.62/km^{2} (252.8/sq mi)
- Time zone: UTC+01:00 (CET)
  - Summer (DST): UTC+02:00 (CEST)
- Postal codes: 04680
- Dialling codes: 034381
- Vehicle registration: L, BNA, GHA, GRM, MTL, WUR
- Website: www.colditz.de

Colditz (German pronunciation: [ˈkɔldɪts]) is a small town in the district of Leipzig, in Saxony, Germany. It is best known for Colditz Castle, the site of the Oflag IV-C POW camp for officers in World War II.

== Geography ==
Colditz is situated in the Leipzig Bay, southeast of the city of Leipzig. The town centre is located on the banks of Zwickau Mulde river, south of its confluence with the Freiberg Mulde. The municipality had a population of 8,374 in 2020.

The town Colditz consists of Colditz proper and the Ortsteile (divisions) Bockwitz, Collmen, Commichau, Erlbach, Erlln, Hausdorf, Hohnbach, Kaltenborn, Koltzschen, Lastau, Leisenau, Maaschwitz, Meuselwitz, Möseln, Podelwitz, Raschütz, Schönbach, Sermuth, Skoplau, Tanndorf, Terpitzsch, Zollwitz, Zschadraß, Zschetzsch and Zschirla.

== History ==
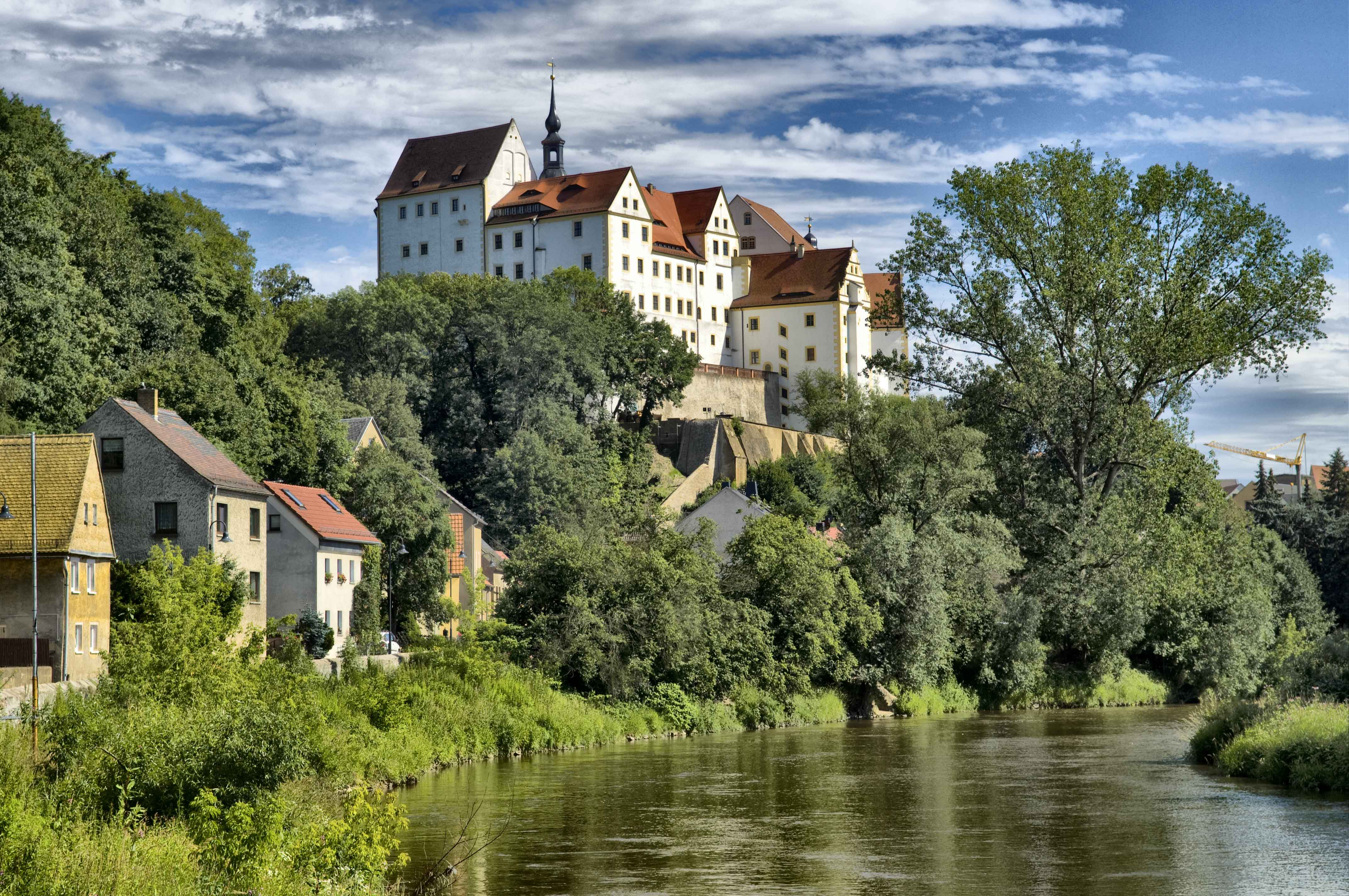
Colditz Castle on the Mulde river

The first record of a burgward on the Mulde river, called Cholidistcha, dates to the year 1046, when Emperor Henry III dedicated it to his consort Agnes of Poitou. The name is possibly of Slavic origin.

In 1083, Henry's son and successor Henry IV recommended that his follower Count Wiprecht of Groitzsch build a castle on the cliff above the river. From 1158, under the rule of Emperor Frederick Barbarossa, the fortress became the residence of the noble House of Colditz, a dynasty of ministeriales in the Imperial Pleissnerland territory. In the 12th century, merchant houses were built around a marketplace below the castle and St. Nicholas' Church was built. In 1265, the Colditz citizens were granted town privileges by the ruler.

In 1243, the former Imperial estates were pledged to the Wettin margrave Henry III of Meissen. His grandson, Margrave Frederick I of Meissen occupied Colditz Castle in 1309. The whole lordship was finally incorporated into the Margravate of Meissen by 1404. Merged into the Electorate of Saxony from 1423, Colditz was held by Elector Ernest upon the 1485 Treaty of Leipzig.

In 1504, the local baker accidentally set Colditz on fire, and the city hall, church, castle and a large part of the town went up in flames. In 1506, reconstruction began and new buildings were raised around the rear castle courtyard. After the defeat of Elector John Frederick I of Saxony in the Schmalkaldic War of 1546–47, the town passed to his cousin Maurice. His descendants continued to rebuild Colditz Castle as a hunting lodge. From 1602 to 1622, it served as the residence of Dowager Electress Sophie, widow of Elector Christian I.

In the 17th century, the cloth and linen manufacture developed. In the 18th century, clay from the Colditz area started to be used in the Meissen porcelain factory that was established in 1710 by Elector Augustus the Strong. In 1804 a ceramics factory was established in Colditz by Thomsberger & Hermann.

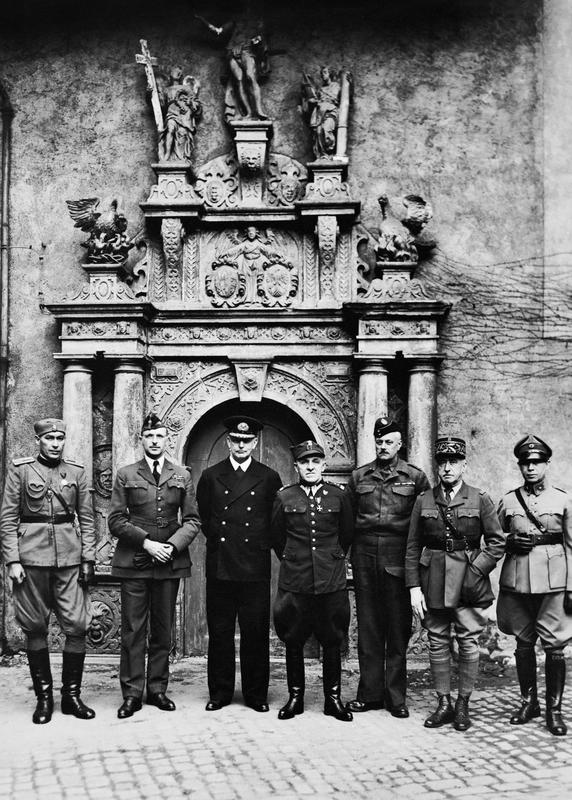
Allied officers at Colditz Castle (1941)

In the Nazi era, Colditz Castle was temporarily used as a concentration camp by the SA and as a Reichsarbeitsdienst camp. During the Second World War, the town did not suffer any damage. In 1940, the town became the headquarters of the German military district Wehrkreis IV for personnel guarding an Oflag POW camp for officers, when Oflag IV-C was established in the castle. It became widely known after the war, for both its notable inmates (Prominente), such as Giles Romilly or George Lascelles, and several escape attempts.

On 14 April 1945, the U.S. Army entered the town and freed the prisoners. However, under agreements signed at the Yalta Conference, the Americans withdrew and were replaced by Soviet occupation forces late in June 1945. As a result, Colditz and the entire state of Saxony became part of East Germany. In 1958, the publicly owned porcelain factory was established. It produced a major part of the dishes used by Mitropa, as evident by the manufacturer's logo "cp". Both the porcelain and chamotte industries went into decline after 1990.

Since German reunification in 1990, efforts have been made to increase visits by tourists. The castle was restored and has become a much visited museum. The great flood of August 2002 as well as the flood of 2013 caused some damage to the old town, but it has since been restored.

== Sights ==
- Colditz Castle
- St. Nicholas Church – Originally built in the middle of the 12th century.
- Old Marketplace – Markt, the houses at #13 and #21 were built around 1600.
- Lower Market #3 – Untermarkt 3 – a Gothic house with steep gabled roof with date 1564.
- Johann David Köhler house – the grandfather of information science and a grandfather of library science was born here 16 January 1684.

== Transport ==
The nearest airports are Leipzig-Altenburg Airport (26 km) and Leipzig/Halle Airport (52 km). Traffic on the section of the Glauchau-Großbothen railway line, which ran through Colditz, ceased in 2000. Public transport is provided by buses, with services to Grimma, Leisnig, Hartha, Rochlitz, and Bad Lausick, as well as to several villages in the vicinity.

== Wartime dramatisations ==
The story of the wartime prisoners at Oflag IV-C was documented by Patrick Robert ("Pat") Reid in his books The Colditz Story and The Latter Days At Colditz, and the former was used as the basis for a 1955 film directed by Guy Hamilton. In the early 1970s the BBC broadcast a series, Colditz, created by Brian Degas and Gerard Glaister, with Reid as technical advisor. In 1973 the TV comedy series The Two Ronnies shot a sketch "Colditz" featuring Ronnie Corbett in the role of the new detainee and Ronnie Barker as camp commandant. Beginning in 1973 a board game Escape from Colditz was marketed by Parker Brothers, followed by a computer game in 1991.

== Notable people ==
=== From the city ===
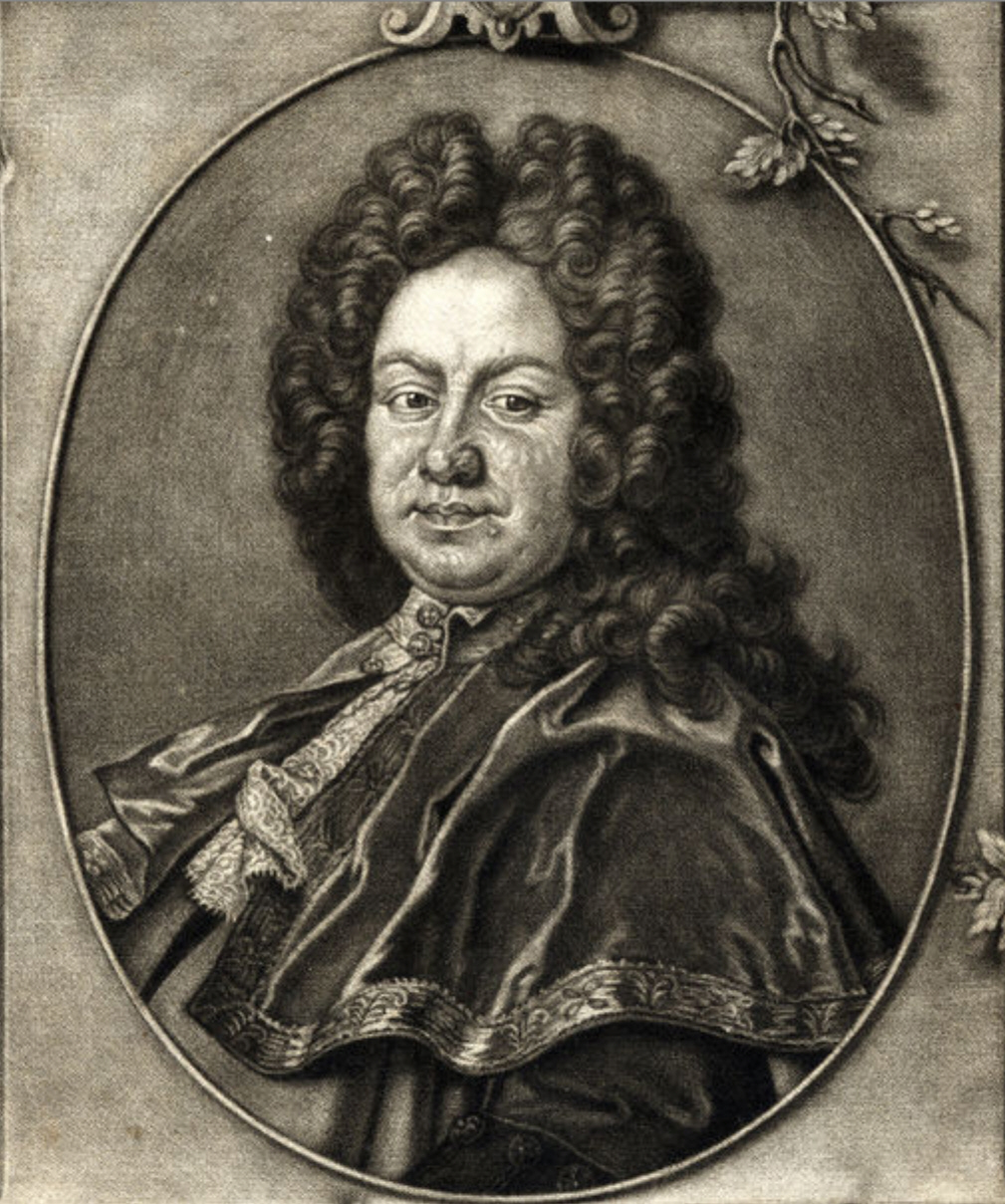
Johann David Koehler 1720

- Johann David Köhler (1684–1755), historian and numismatic
- Paul Nitsche (1876–1948), psychiatrist and one of the men responsible for the medical murders during the Nazi era, executed for crimes against humanity
- Ernst Bergmann (1881–1945), professor of philosophy and pedagogy and proponent of a new German national religion.
- Werner Gruner (1904–1995), mechanical engineer and university lecturer
- Jürgen Schumann (1940–1977), pilot of the Lufthansa, victim of the Red Army Faction
- Clemens Pickel (born 1961), bishop of the diocese of Saratov in Russia

=== Others related to the city ===
- Christian Führer (1943–2014), priest in Colditz from 1968 to 1980, an initiator of the peaceful revolution in the GDR as pastor of the Nikolaikirche in Leipzig
- Ernest, Elector of Saxony (1441–1486), died on 26 August 1486 near Colditz, when he fell from his horse on a ride
