= Petra Nicolaisen =

German politician

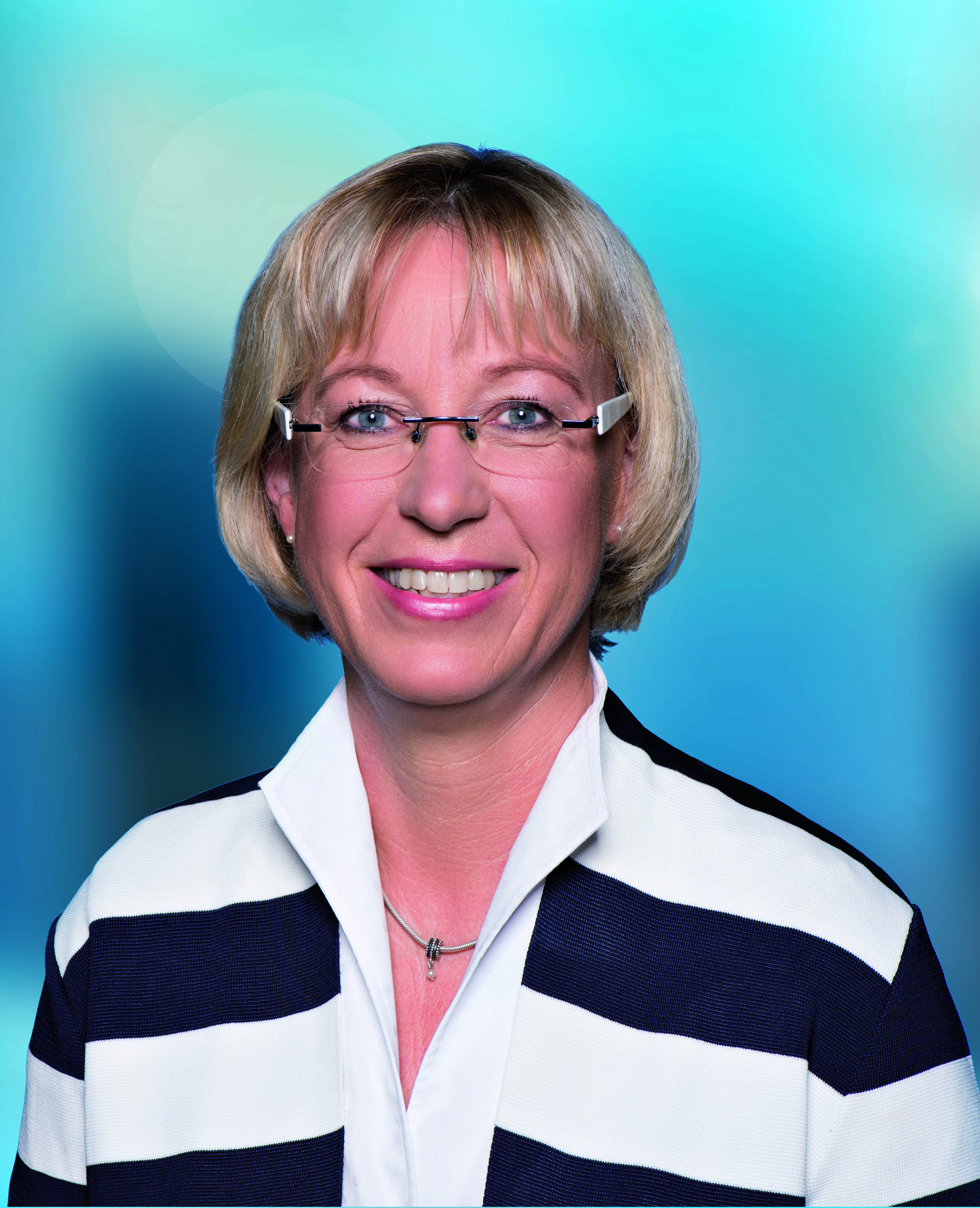
- Nicolaisen in 2018

Member of the Bundestag for Schleswig-Holstein
- In office 26 October 2021 – 2025
- Constituency: CDU State-wide list
- In office 24 September 2017 – 26 October 2021
- Preceded by: Sabine Sütterlin-Waack
- Succeeded by: Robert Habeck
- Constituency: Flensburg – Schleswig

Personal details
- Born: 12 December 1965 (age 60) Schleswig, West Germany
- Party: Christian Democratic Union

Petra Nicolaisen (born 12 December 1965) is a German politician of the Christian Democratic Union (CDU) who has served as a member of the Bundestag from the state of Schleswig-Holstein from 2017 to 2025.

== Political career ==
From 2009 until 2017, Nicolaisen was a member of the State Parliament of Schleswig-Holstein for three terms, where she served on the Committee on Internal and Legal Affairs. She also served on the Committee on the Environment and Agriculture and the Committee on Petitions from 2009 until 2012.

Nicolaisen became a member of the Bundestag in the 2017 German federal election, representing the Flensburg – Schleswig constituency. She lost the constituency to Green Party co-leader Robert Habeck in 2021, but was nevertheless re-elected to the Bundestag through the CDU state party list in Schleswig-Holstein. She failed to be re-elected in the 2025 German federal election. She was a member of the Committee on Internal Affairs.

In addition to her committee assignments, Nicolaisen co-chairs the German-Nordic Parliamentary Friendship Group and is a member of the German delegation to the Baltic Sea Parliamentary Conference (BSPC).
