= Mayra Vriesema =

German politician (born 1999)

Member of the Bundestag
- Incumbent
- Assumed office 1 September 2025
- Preceded by: Robert Habeck
- Constituency: Schleswig-Holstein

Personal details
- Born: 25 December 1999 (age 26)
- Party: Alliance 90/The Greens

Mayra Tjorven Vriesema (born 25 December 1999) is a German politician serving as a member of the Bundestag since 2025. From 2021 to 2024, she served as deputy chairwoman of Alliance 90/The Greens in Schleswig-Holstein.
