= Wolfgang Börnsen =

German politician (1942–2024)

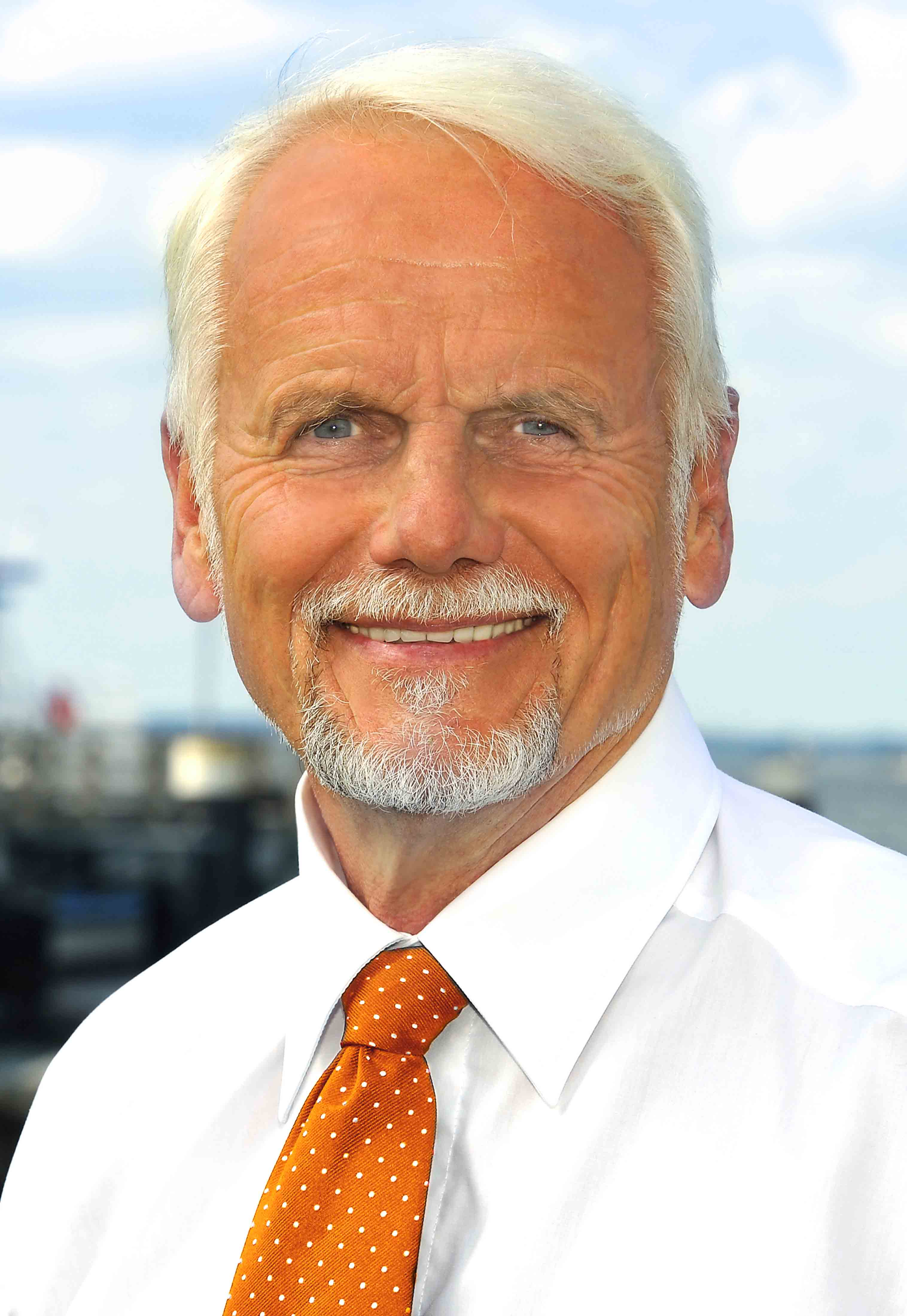
- Börnsen in 2009

Member of the Bundestag
- In office 18 February 1987 – 22 October 2013
- Preceded by: Harm Dallmeyer
- Succeeded by: Sabine Sütterlin-Waack
- Constituency: Flensburg – Schleswig

Personal details
- Born: 26 April 1942 Flensburg, Gau Schleswig-Holstein, Germany
- Died: 2 November 2024 (aged 82)
- Party: Christian Democratic Union
- Children: Four
- Education: Pädagogische Akademie Kiel
- Occupation: Teacher

Wolfgang Börnsen (26 April 1942 – 2 November 2024) was a German politician who was a member of the CDU, which he joined in 1967. He was born in Flensburg and was a member of the Bundestag from 1987 to 2013.

== Life and career ==
Börnsen graduated from Realschule and did an apprenticeship as bricklayer. He graduated then from business school (Högere Hannelsschool) in Flensburg and studied at pedagogical high school in Kiel (Pädagoogsche Hoochschool) to become teacher. He worked as teacher for religion and history.

Later he worked for Flensburger Tagblatt as reporter.

Börnsen died on 2 November 2024, at the age of 82.

== Bibliography ==
- Vorbild mit kleinen Fehlern – Abgeordnete zwischen Anspruch und Wirklichkeit. Siegler, Sankt Augustin, 2001, ISBN 3-87748-613-4
- Plattdeutsch im Deutschen Bundestag. Siegler, Sankt Augustin, 2001, ISBN 3-87748-614-2
- Fels oder Brandung? Gerhard Stoltenberg – der verkannte Visionär. Siegler, Sankt Augustin, 2004, ISBN 978-3-87748-644-3
- Rettet Berlin – Schleswig-Holsteins Beitrag zur Luftbrücke 1948/49. Wachholtz, Neumünster, 2008, ISBN 978-3-529-02812-0
