= Johann David Köhler =

German historian

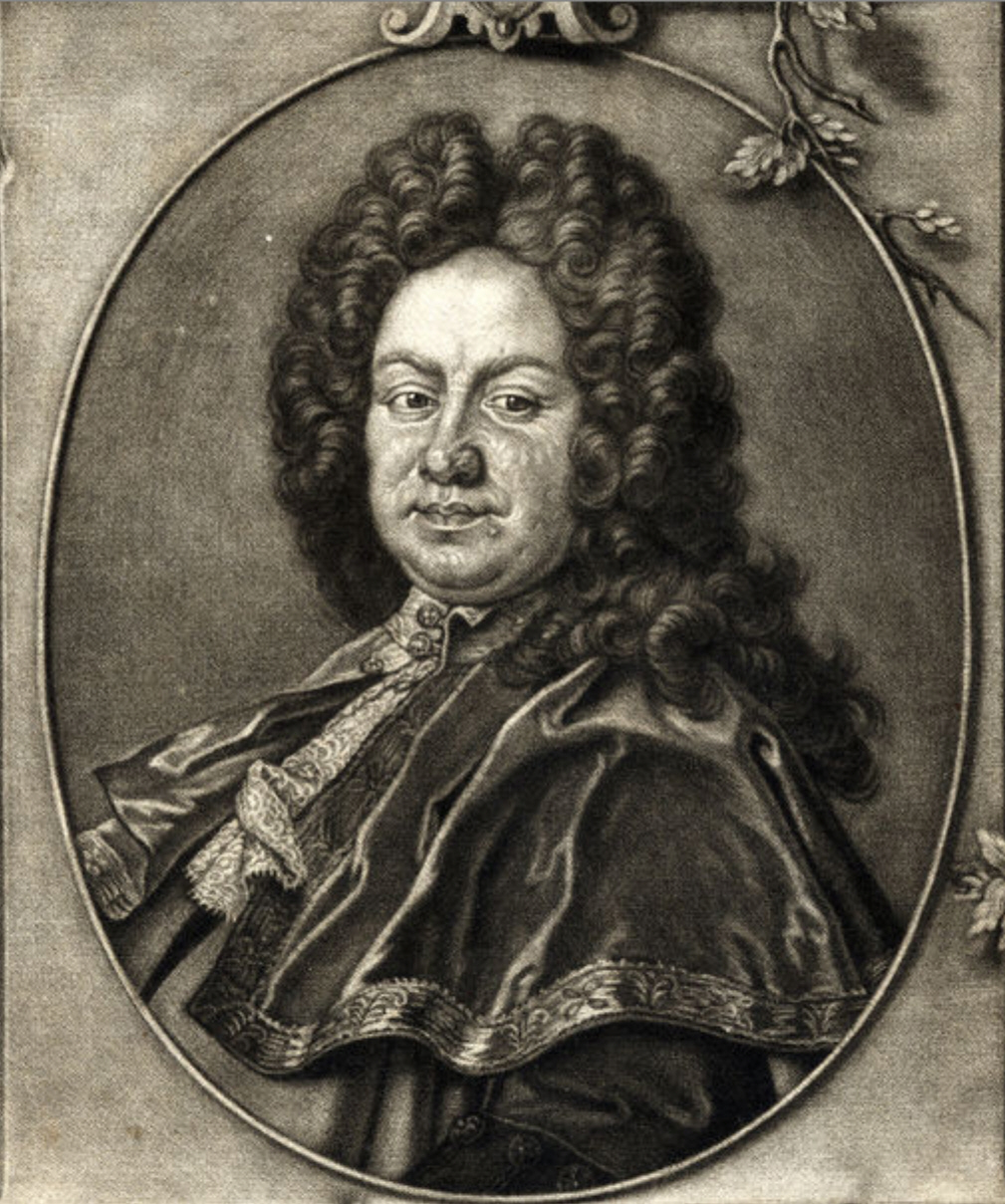
Johann David Köhler

Johann David Köhler (18 January 1684 – 10 March 1755) was a German historian. His academic focuses were on Roman coins as historical artifacts, ancient weapons, and genealogy. Köhler also served as university librarian at Altdorf and contributed to the early library science literature.

== Life ==
Köhler was born in Colditz in the Electorate of Saxony and studied at the University of Wittenberg. He was a professor of logic and history at universities in Altdorf and later Göttingen and served briefly as university librarian at Altdorf. He died in Göttingen.

== Influence ==
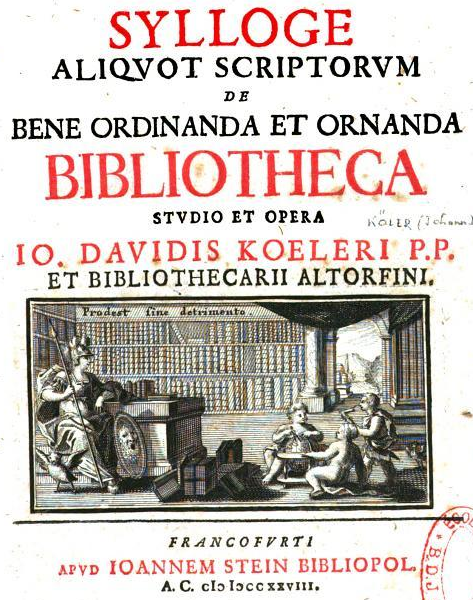
Köhler's Sylloge aliquot scriptorum de bene ordinanda bibliotheca, 1728

Köhler came into scholarly prominence in a transitional period for European scholarship. From the Middle Ages and into the Enlightenment, European scholars were part of a "common culture of scholarship", a respublica litteraria (Eskildsen 2005: 421). That common culture of scholarship was subjected to a series of nationalistic and religious pressures across the eighteenth century so that as Köhler came into prominence in the eighteenth century, there had been a shift from the pan-European imagined community to a more parochial nationalist one (Anderson 1991).

His credentials as a library and information scientist are based upon three of his monographs: Syllogie aliquot Scriptorum de bene ordinanda et ornanda Bibliotheca, published in 1728; Hochverdiente und aus bewährten Urkunden wohlbeglaubte Ehren-Rettung Johann Guttenbergs, eingebohrnen Bürgers in Mayntz in 1741; and Anweisung für reisende Gelerte, Bibliothecken, Münz-Cabinette, Antiquitäten-Zimmer, Bilder-Sale, Naturalien- und Kunst-Kammern, u.d.m mit Nutzen zubesehen from 1762. The 1728 Syllogie… is a bibliographic examination of major history texts of the day and is in keeping with the role of historians then and now. The 1741 Hochverdiente… is an examination of the assertion that Johann Gutenberg was indeed the inventor of movable type – the printing press – against competing claims. Bernhard von Mallinckrodt (1591–1664) is credited with writing the first defense of Gutenberg as the inventor of the printing press in 1639 (Schmidmaier 2001), but Köhler is said to have authored second and definitive defense (Eck 2000). Köhler's third and most important work within this context is the 1792 Anweisung für reisende Gelerte, Bibliothecken, Műnz-Cabinette, Antiquitäten-Zimmer, Bilder-Sale, Naturalien und Kunst-Kammern, u.d.m mit Nutzen zubesehen.

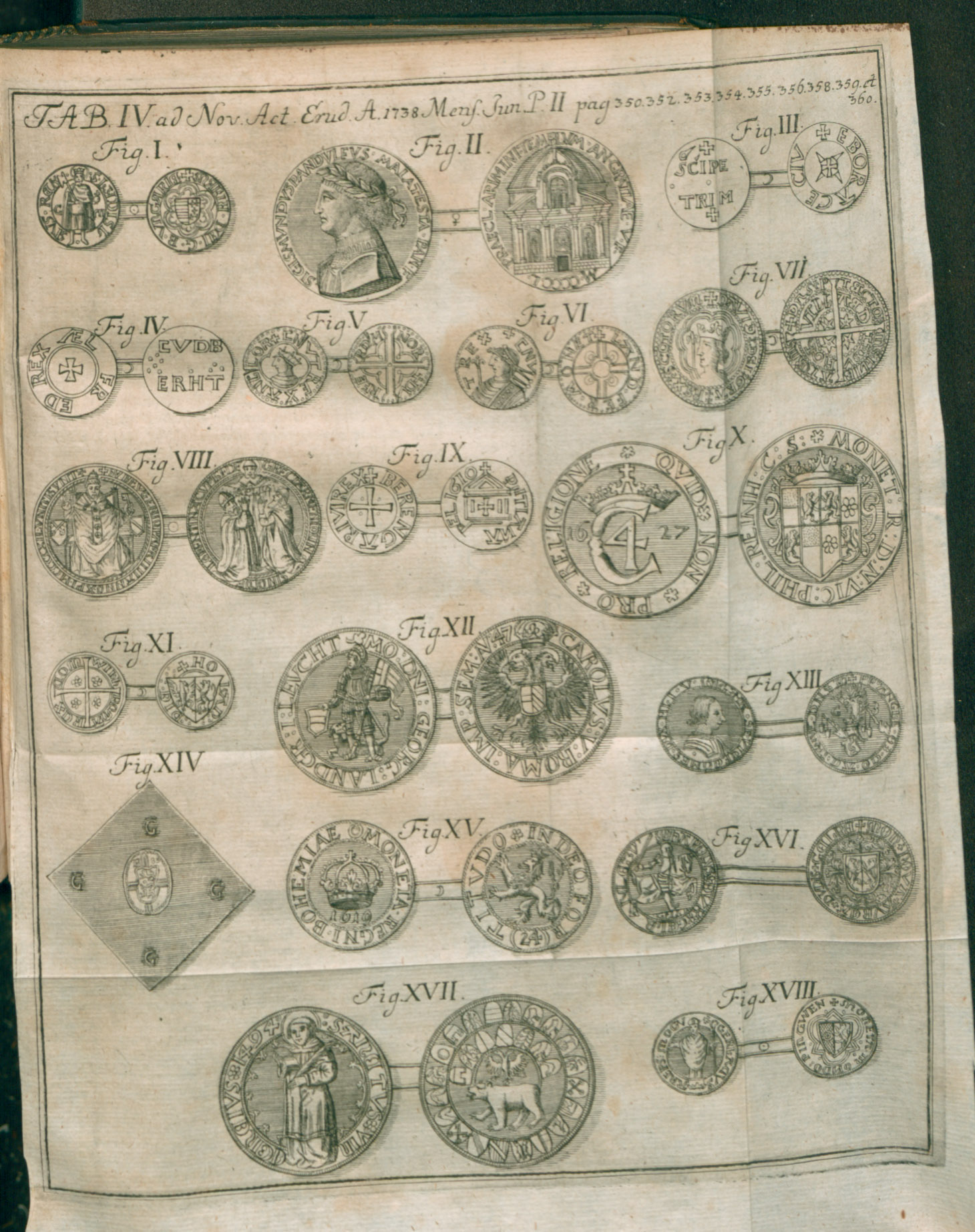
Illustration of Kohler's numismatic studies from Acta Eruditorum, 1738

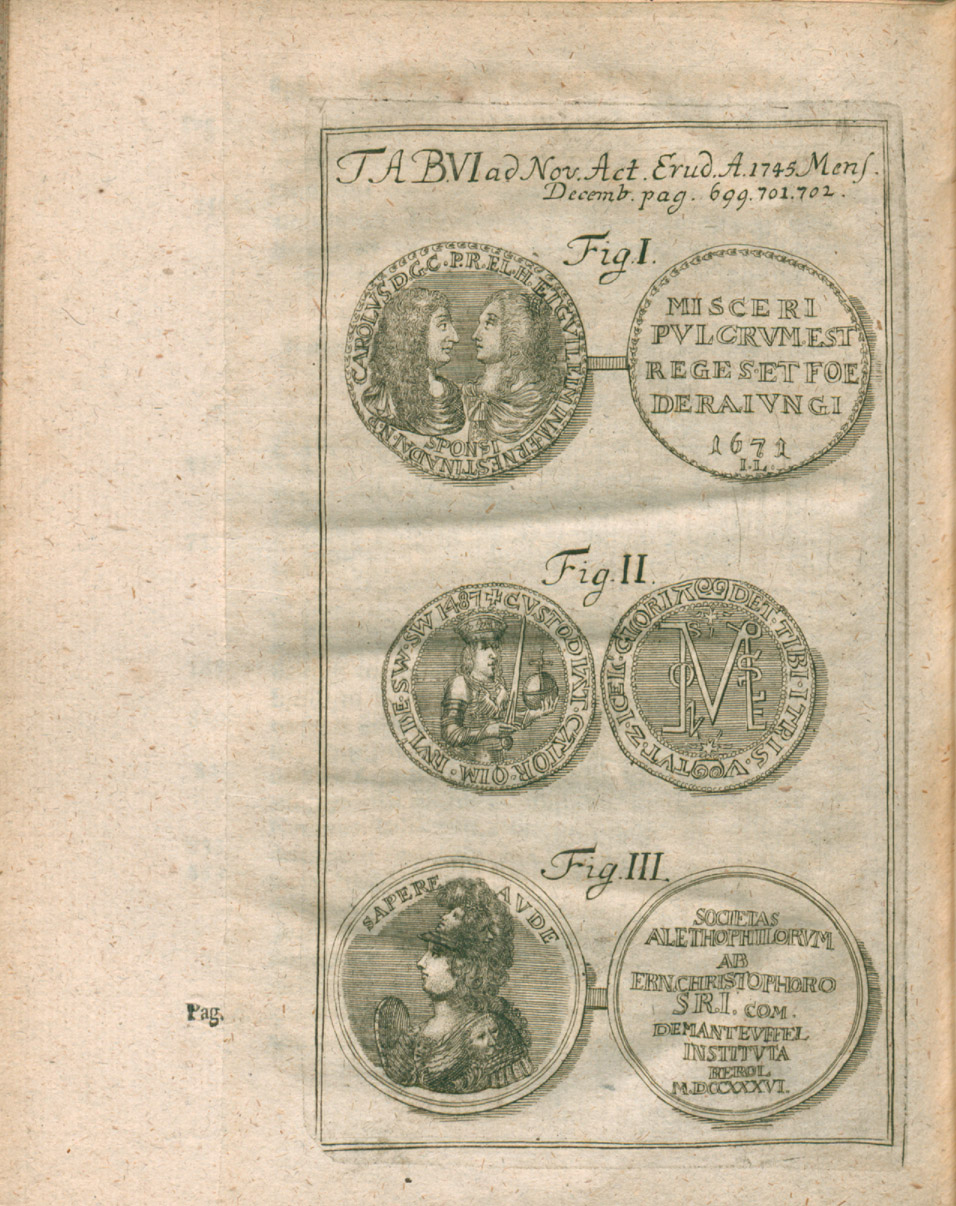
Illustration of Kohler's numismatic studies from Acta Eruditorum, 1745

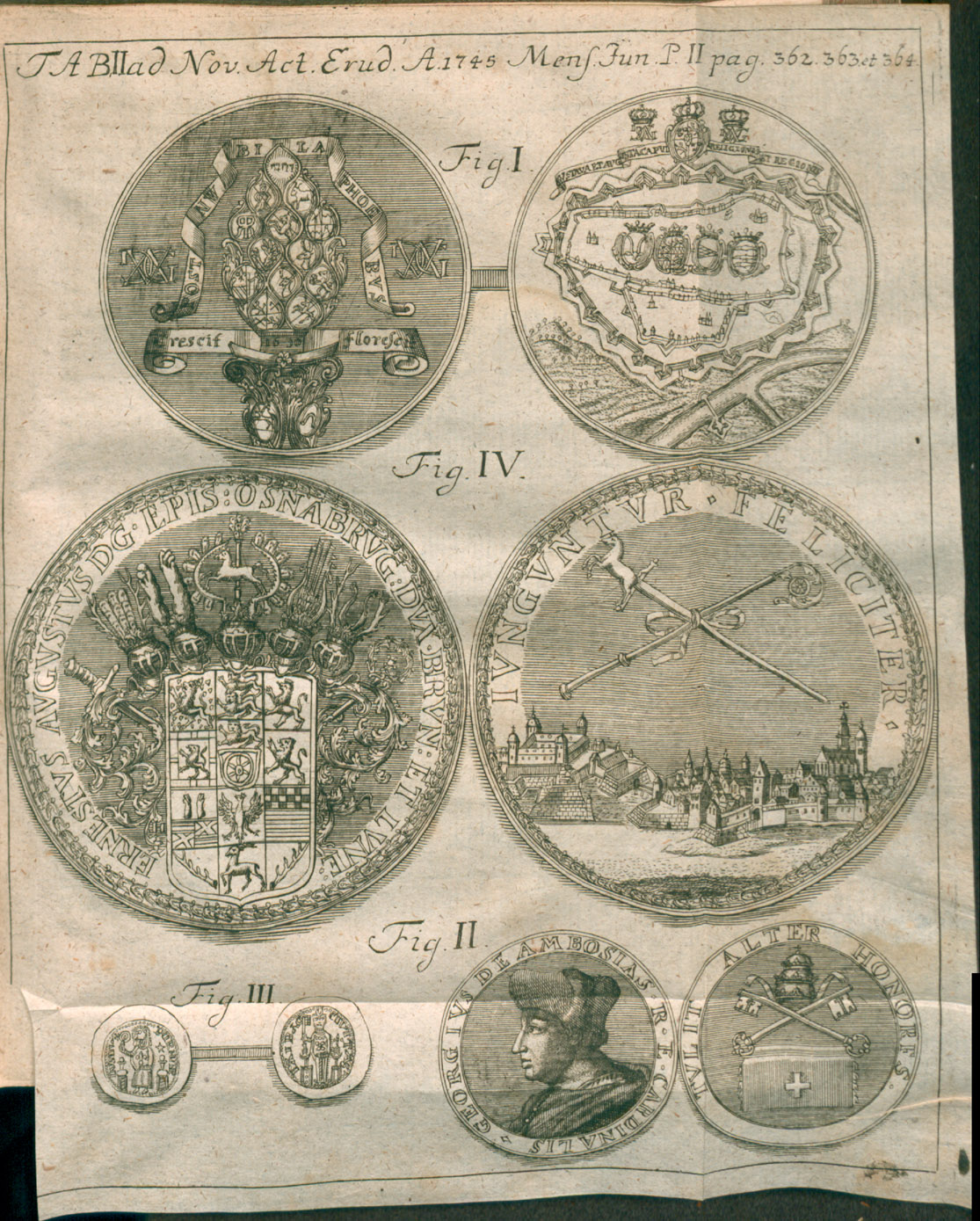
Illustration of Kohler's numismatic studies from Acta Eruditorum, 1745

Finally, Köhler published a scholarly journal on Roman coins and numismatics in general. His son Johann Tobias Köhler continued that interest. This journal is important to library science in that it is among the first true serials ever published.

== Works ==
- Orbis terrarum in nuce, sive Compendium historiae civilis chronologicum in sculptura memoriali
- 1719: Bequemer Schul- und Reise-Atlas. Nürnberg: Christoph Weigel
- 1724: Anleitung zu der verbesserten neuen Geographie, vornemlich zum Gebrauch der Weigelschen Landcharten. Nürnberg: Christoph Weigel
- 1726: Genealogische Geschichte der Herren und Grafen von Wolfstein
- 1730: Kurze und gründliche Anleitung zu der alten und mittleren Geographie. Nürnberg: Christoph Weigel
