= Zschadraß =

- Ortsteil of Colditz
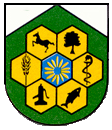
- Coat of arms
- Interactive map of Zschadraß
- Location within Germany Location within Saxony
- Coordinates: 51°8′16″N 12°49′9″E
- Country: Germany
- State: Saxony
- District: Leipzig
- Town: Colditz

Area
  - Total: 32.47 km^{2} (12.54 sq mi)
- Elevation: 189 m (620 ft)

Population (2009-12-31)
  - Total: 3,297
  - Density: 101.5/km^{2} (263.0/sq mi)
- Time zone: UTC+01:00 (CET)
  - Summer (DST): UTC+02:00 (CEST)
- Postal codes: 04680
- Dialling codes: 034381
- Vehicle registration: L

Zschadraß is a village and a former municipality in the Leipzig district in Saxony, Germany. Since 1 January 2011, it is part of the town Colditz.
