= Ernst Bergmann (philosopher) =

German philosopher

- Born: 7 August 1881; Colditz, Kingdom of Saxony, German Empire
- Died: 16 April 1945 (aged 63); Naumburg, Nazi Germany
- Known for: Leading proponent of Gemeinschaft Deutsche Volksreligion
- Partner: Gertrud Landsberg (1917–25)

Ernst Bergmann (7 August 1881 – 16 April 1945) was a German philosopher and pedagogue.

== Biography ==
The son of Lutheran pastor Ernst Albin Bergmann (1838–1894) and of Swiss-born Marie Louise Linder (1846–1934), Ernst Bergmann studied philosophy and German philology at the University of Leipzig and got his PhD in 1905. Then he continued his studies in Berlin; later he returned to Leipzig, where he received the status of Privatdozent at the university in 1911. In 1916 he was awarded the position of Ausserordentlicher Professor (professor without chair). In 1917, he married Gertrud Landsberg, daughter of a Jewish family from Posen. They became parents of two sons: Ulrich (1918–1940) and Dieter (1920–1995). Ulrich died in battle as a soldier of the Wehrmacht, Dieter became a physician and emigrated to the USA. In 1995, Dieter published a memoir, which is an important source for his father's biography. The marriage ended in divorce in 1925.

Ernst Bergmann's philosophical works comprise a lot of different areas. During his early years before World War I, he was a noted expert on the philosophy of French philosopher Jean-Marie Guyau, after that he became a well-known German "Neofichteaner", with works on the philosophy of German philosopher Johann Gottlieb Fichte and on the history of German thought. Although Bergmann joined the National Socialist German Workers Party in 1930, he published in 1932 a book about the dangers and the harmfulness of patriarchy that ran contrary to the leading Nazi ideology ("Erkenntnisgeist und Muttergeist. Eine Soziosophie der Geschlechter"). After Hitler had become German Chancellor in 1933, Bergmann nevertheless hoped that the new regime would bring a cultural revolution, especially in the area of religion and philosophy. Bergmann was strongly opposed to both Christianity and Judaism and propagated a new kind of religiosity (Deutschreligion) based on his own philosophy and the pre-Christian spiritual roots of the German people. His works during the Nazi area concentrated on religious and philosophical topics. In the years of World War II, Bergmann became alienated from the Hitler regime and was excluded from the NSDAP in 1943.

== Works and ideology ==
His works Die deutsche Nationalkirche (the German National Church) and Die natürliche Geistlehre (The Natural Doctrine of the Spirit) were placed on the Index Librorum Prohibitorum, the Roman Catholic list of banned books, in 1934 and 1937.

== Heart attack and death ==
In the winter of either 1944 or 1945, Bergmann suffered a heart attack, and in April 1945 he died, according to the memoir of his son Dieter, due to his severe heart problems.

== Works ==
- Georg Friedrich Meier als Mitbegründer der deutschen Ästhetik Unter Benutzung ungedruckter Quellen, 1910
- Die begründung der deutschen ästhetik durch Alex. Gottleib Baumgarten und Georg Friedrich Meier, 1911
- Ernst Platner und die Kunstphilosophie des 18. Jahrhunderts, 1913
- Geschichte der Ästhetik und Kunstphilosophie. Ein Forschungsbericht, 1914
- Die Grundlagen der deutschen Bildung Ein Vortrag, geh. im Leipziger Lehrerverein 1916, 1916
- Die weltgeschichtliche mission der deutschen bildung kriegsvorlesungen gehalten an der universität Leipzig, 1915
- Deutsche Führer zur Humanität, F. Meiner, 1915
- Fichte, der Erzieher zum Deutschtum, 1915
- Die Erlösungslehre Schopenhauers, 1921
- Einführung in die philosophie: Weltproblem, Band 2, 1926
- Einführung in die philosophie: Erkenntnisproblem, Band 1, 1926
- Weltanschauung; Philosophisches Lesebuch, 1 i 2, 1926
- J. G. Fichte der Erzieher, 1928
- Deutsche Mystik, 1928
- Die Entsinkung ins Weiselose: Seelengeschichte eines modernen Mystikers, 1932
- Erkenntnisgeist und Muttergeist. Eine Soziosophie der Geschlechter, 1932.
- Fichte und der Nationalsozialismus, 1933
- Die Deutsche Nationalkirche, 1933.
- Deutschland, das Bildungsland der neuen Menschheit. Eine nationalsozialistische Kulturphilosophie, 1933.
- Die 25 Thesen der Deutschreligion. Ein Katechismus, 1934.
- Die deutsche Volkspredigt : Andachten, Vorträge u. Schulungsbriefe zur Deutschreligion,Breslau: Ferdinand Hirt, 1934
- Der Ketzer von Toulouse: dramatische Dichtung in acht Bildern, Leipzig: Fahrenkrog-Verlag, 1935
- Die großen Ideen der deutschen Religion, Leipzig : Fahrenkrog-Verl., 1935
- Die formende Kraft im Weltall, Leipzig : Fahrenkrog-Verl., 1935
- Das Gottesgeheimnis . Gespräch eines Vaters mit seinen Söhnen über Natur und Religion, 1936
- Die natürliche Geistlehre. System einer deutsch nordischen Weltsinndeutung, 1937.
- Was der Deutschreligiöse von Meister Eckhart wissen muss!,, Leipzig : Fahrenkrog-Verl., 1938
- Richtlinien für den deutsch-religiösen Jugendweih-Vorbereitungs-Unterricht - Ernst Bergmann. Hrsg. v. d. Gemeinschaft Dt. Volksreligion e. V., Leipzig : Fahrenkrog-Verl., 1938,
- Was will die Gemeinschaft Deutsche Volksreligion?, Leipzig : Peter [Fahrenkrog-Verl.], 1939
- Die Geburt des Gottes Mensch: Begriff und Wesen der Religion, Leipzig : [Fahrenkrog-Verl., Inh.] Carl Peter, 1939
- Nordisch-germanischer Glaube oder Christentum? : Vortrag, geh. im Auditorium Maximum d. Univ. Berlin am 12. Oktober 1933, Leipzig : C. Peter, 1940
- Kleines System der Deutschen Volksreligion, 1941.

== Secondary Literature ==
- Karl-Heinrich Hunsche: Ernst Bergmann. Sein Leben und Werk, 1936.
- Carl Peter (Hrsg.): Ernst Bergmann und seine Lehre, Leipzig 1941.
- W. Dieter Bergman: Between Two Benches. Not Subject to Extermination, 1995. ISBN 0-940471-19-1
- McNab, Chris (2009). The Third Reich. Amber Books Ltd. ISBN 978-1-906626-51-8.

== See also ==
- Glossary of Nazi Germany
- List of Nazi Party leaders and officials
