= Harm Dallmeyer =

German politician (1946–1983)

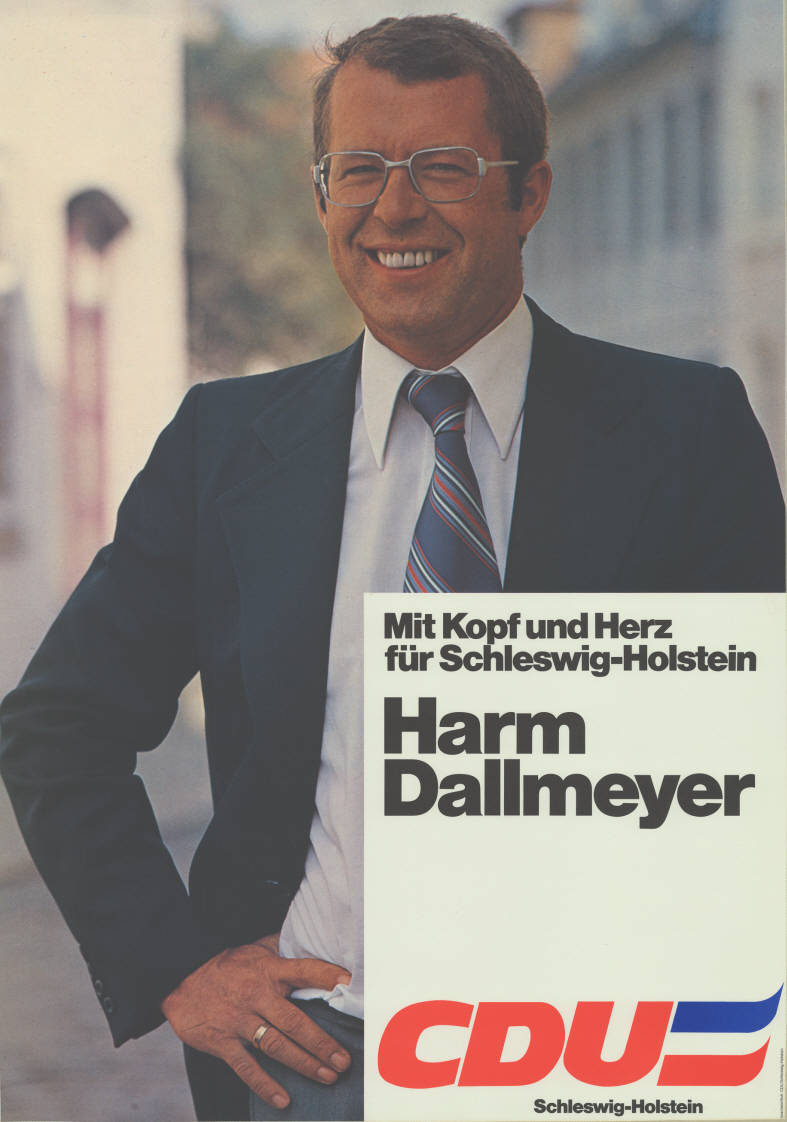
- Candidate poster Harm Dallmeyers for the state election in Schleswig-Holstein 1979

Member of the Bundestag
- In office 4 November 1980 – 11 April 1983

Personal details
- Born: 16 December 1942 Eckernförde
- Died: 11 April 1983 (aged 40) Schleswig, Schleswig-Holstein, Germany
- Party: CDU

Harm Dallmeyer (December 16, 1943 – April 11, 1983) was a German politician of the Christian Democratic Union (CDU) and former member of the German Bundestag.

== Life ==
Dallmeyer joined the CDU in 1971. He became local chairman in Schleswig and member of the district executive committee. From December 1976 to October 1980 he was Secretary General of the CDU Schleswig-Holstein.

From May 29, 1979, to November 3, 1980, he was a member of the state parliament in Schleswig-Holstein. He was a member of the Committee on Internal Affairs and Legal Affairs. He resigned his Landtag mandate after being elected to the Bundestag in 1980, of which he was a member from 4 November. He was elected via the state list of the Christian Democratic Union of Germany (CDU) in Schleswig-Holstein. He was a successful direct candidate in the 1983 Bundestag elections in the constituency of Flensburg - Schleswig and remained a member of the Bundestag until his death on 11 April 1983.

== Literature ==
Herbst, Ludolf; Jahn, Bruno (2002). Vierhaus, Rudolf (ed.). Biographisches Handbuch der Mitglieder des Deutschen Bundestages. 1949–2002 [Biographical Handbook of the Members of the German Bundestag. 1949–2002] (in German). München: De Gruyter - De Gruyter Saur. p. 1715. ISBN 978-3-11-184511-1.
