= Niendorf =

Niendorf may refer to the following places in Germany:

- Niendorf, Brandenburg, a part of Ihlow, Brandenburg.
- Niendorf, Hamburg, a quarter of Hamburg
- a part of Bienenbüttel, Lower Saxony
- Niendorf, Mecklenburg-Vorpommern, in the Nordwestmecklenburg district, Mecklenburg-Vorpommern
- a part of Grebs-Niendorf in the Ludwigslust district, Mecklenburg-Vorpommern
- Groß Niendorf, Mecklenburg-Vorpommern, in the district of Parchim, Mecklenburg-Vorpommern
- Niendorf, Saxony-Anhalt, a part of Oebisfelde-Weferlingen, Saxony-Anhalt
- Niendorf bei Berkenthin, in the Herzogtum Lauenburg district, Schleswig-Holstein
- Niendorf an der Stecknitz, in the Herzogtum Lauenburg district, Schleswig-Holstein
- Niendorf auf Fehmarn, a part of Fehmarn, in the Ostholstein district, Schleswig-Holstein,
- Niendorf (Timmendorfer Strand), a part of Timmendorfer Strand, in the Ostholstein district, Schleswig-Holstein
- Groß Niendorf, Schleswig-Holstein, in the district of Segeberg, Schleswig-Holstein

It may also be referring to the former German name for Nieczajna, a village in Oborniki County, Greater Poland Voivodeship, in west-central Poland.
