= Górka, Oborniki County =

Górka
- Village
- Location within Poland
- Coordinates: 52°35′N 16°42′E
- Country: Poland
- Voivodeship: Greater Poland
- County: Oborniki
- Gmina: Oborniki

Górka ([ˈɡurka]; German: Gorkau Vorwerk) is a village in the administrative district of Gmina Oborniki, within Oborniki County, Greater Poland Voivodeship, in west-central Poland.
