= Dąbrówka Leśna =

- Village
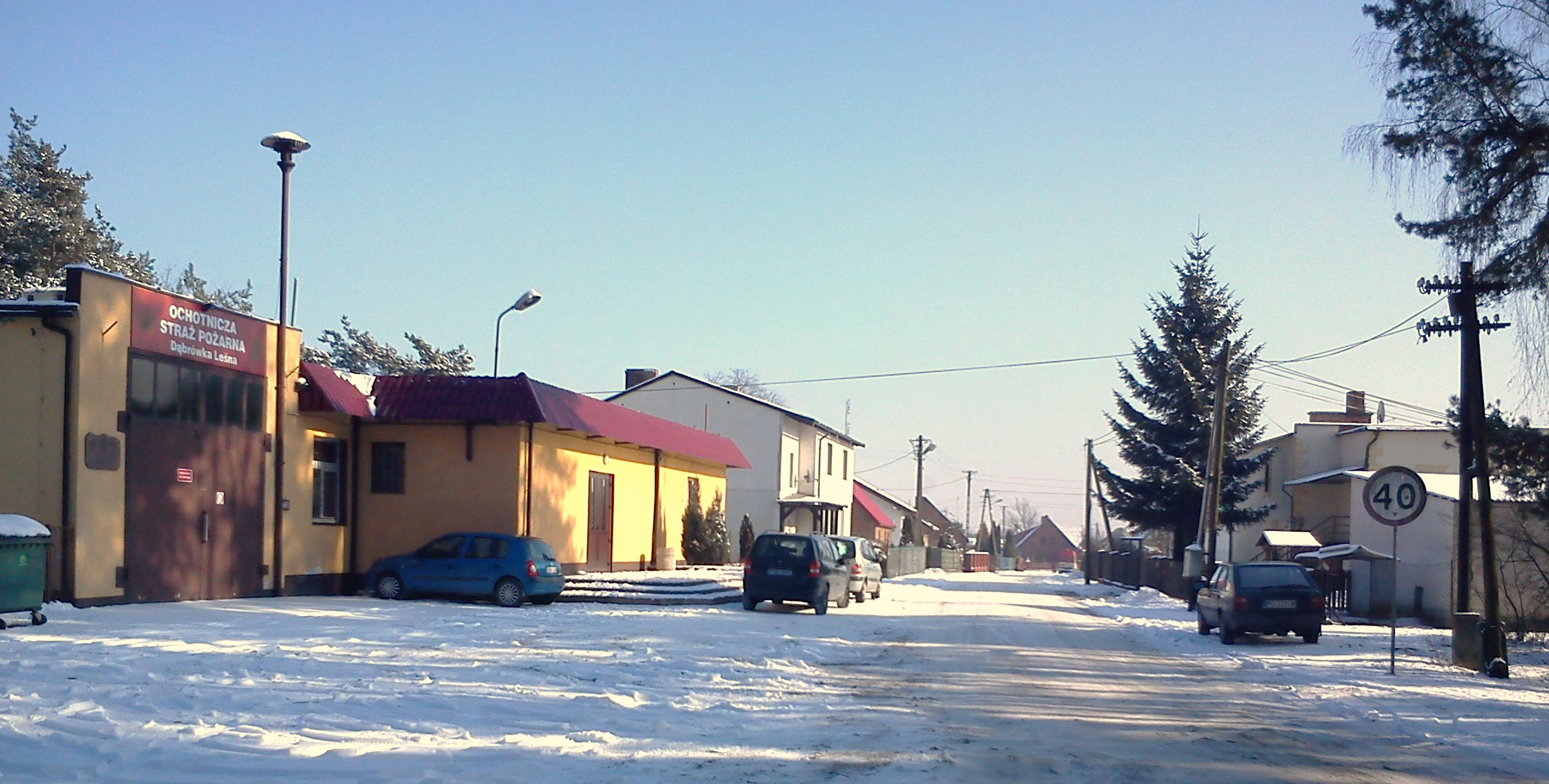
- Road in Dąbrówka Leśna

- Location within Poland
- Coordinates: 52°41′N 16°48′E
- Country: Poland
- Voivodeship: Greater Poland
- County: Oborniki
- Gmina: Oborniki

Dąbrówka Leśna ([dɔmˈbrufka ˈlɛɕna]; German: Heindenwalde) is a village in the administrative district of Gmina Oborniki, within Oborniki County, Greater Poland Voivodeship, in west-central Poland.
