= Wargowo, Greater Poland Voivodeship =

Wargowo
- Village
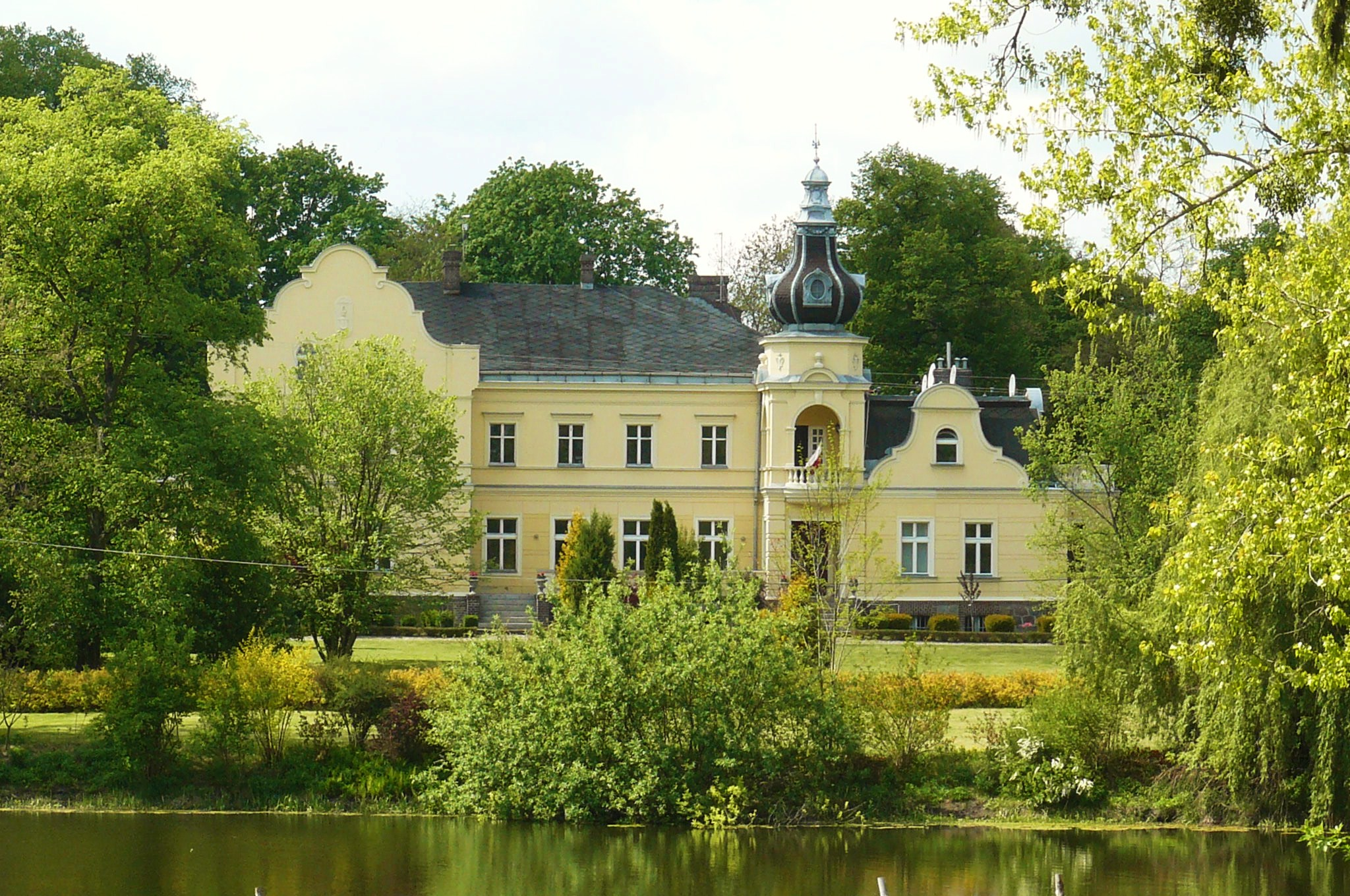
- Palace

- Location within Poland
- Coordinates: 52°35′N 16°48′E
- Country: Poland
- Voivodeship: Greater Poland
- County: Oborniki
- Gmina: Oborniki

Wargowo ([varˈɡɔvɔ]; German: Wargen) is a village in the administrative district of Gmina Oborniki, within Oborniki County, Greater Poland Voivodeship, in west-central Poland.
