= Sycyn =

- Village
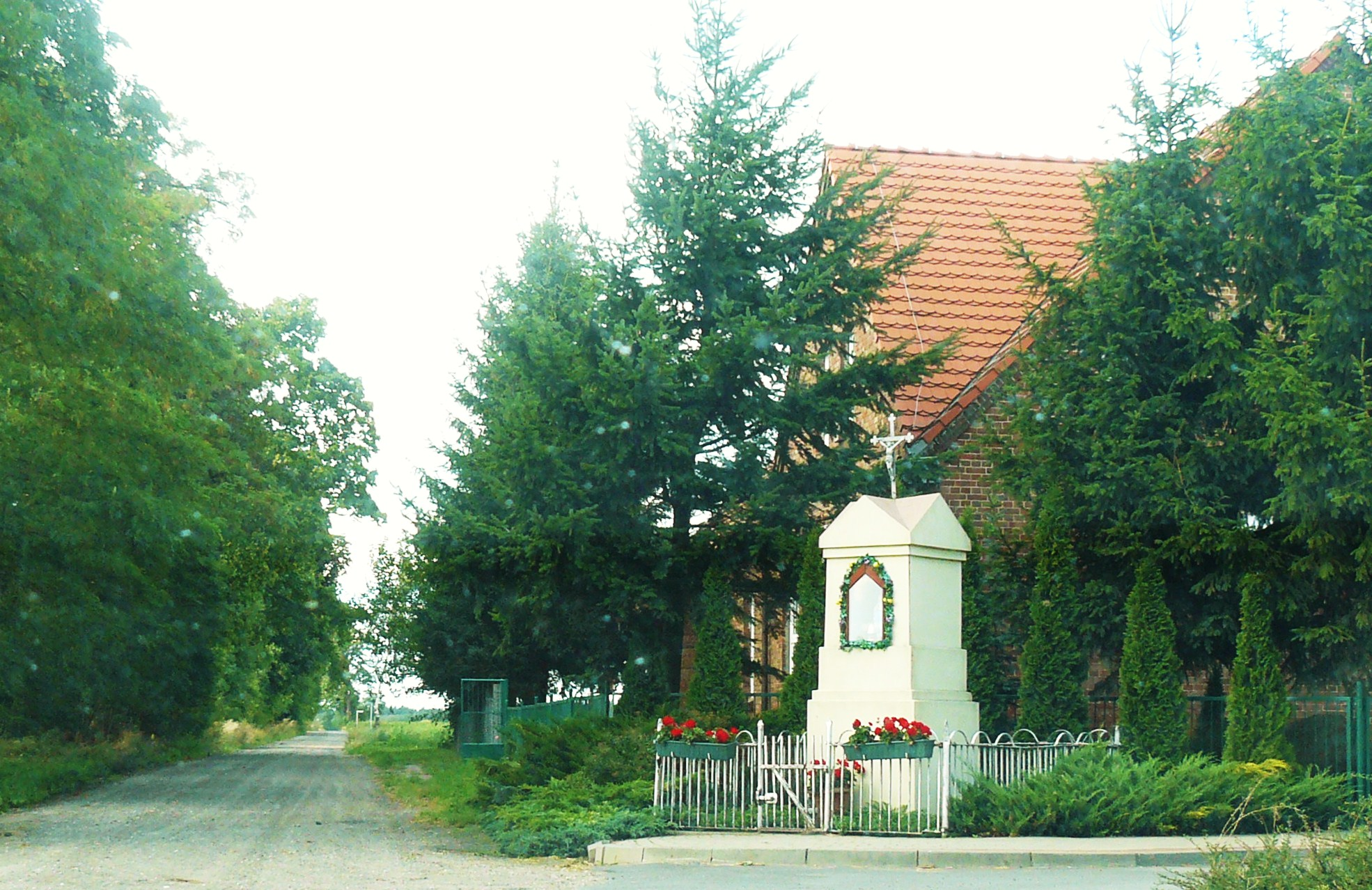
- Road in Sycyn

- Location within Poland
- Coordinates: 52°40′N 16°39′E
- Country: Poland
- Voivodeship: Greater Poland
- County: Oborniki
- Gmina: Oborniki

Sycyn ([ˈsɨt͡sɨn]; German: Scheidenau) is a village in the administrative district of Gmina Oborniki, within Oborniki County, Greater Poland Voivodeship, in west-central Poland.
