= Bębnikąt =

Bębnikąt may refer to the following places:

- Bębnikąt, Greater Poland Voivodeship (west-central Poland)
- Bębnikąt, Kołobrzeg County in West Pomeranian Voivodeship (north-west Poland)
- Bębnikąt, Stargard County in West Pomeranian Voivodeship (north-west Poland)
