= Lukovo =

Lukovo may refer to:

- Lukovo, Bulgaria, a village in Bulgaria
- Lukovo, Zagreb County, a village near Vrbovec, Croatia
- Lukovo, Lika-Senj County, a village near Senj, Croatia
- Lukovo, Nikšić, Montenegro
- Lukovo, Struga, a village near Struga, North Macedonia
- Lukovo (Boljevac), a village in Serbia
- Lukovo (Kuršumlija), a village and spa in Serbia
- Lukovo (Raška), a village in Serbia
- Lukovo (Svrljig), a village in Serbia
- Lukovo (Vranje), a village in Serbia

== See also ==
- Lukovo Šugarje
- Lukovë
- Łukowo (disambiguation)
