= Wymysłowo, Oborniki County =

Wymysłowo
- Village
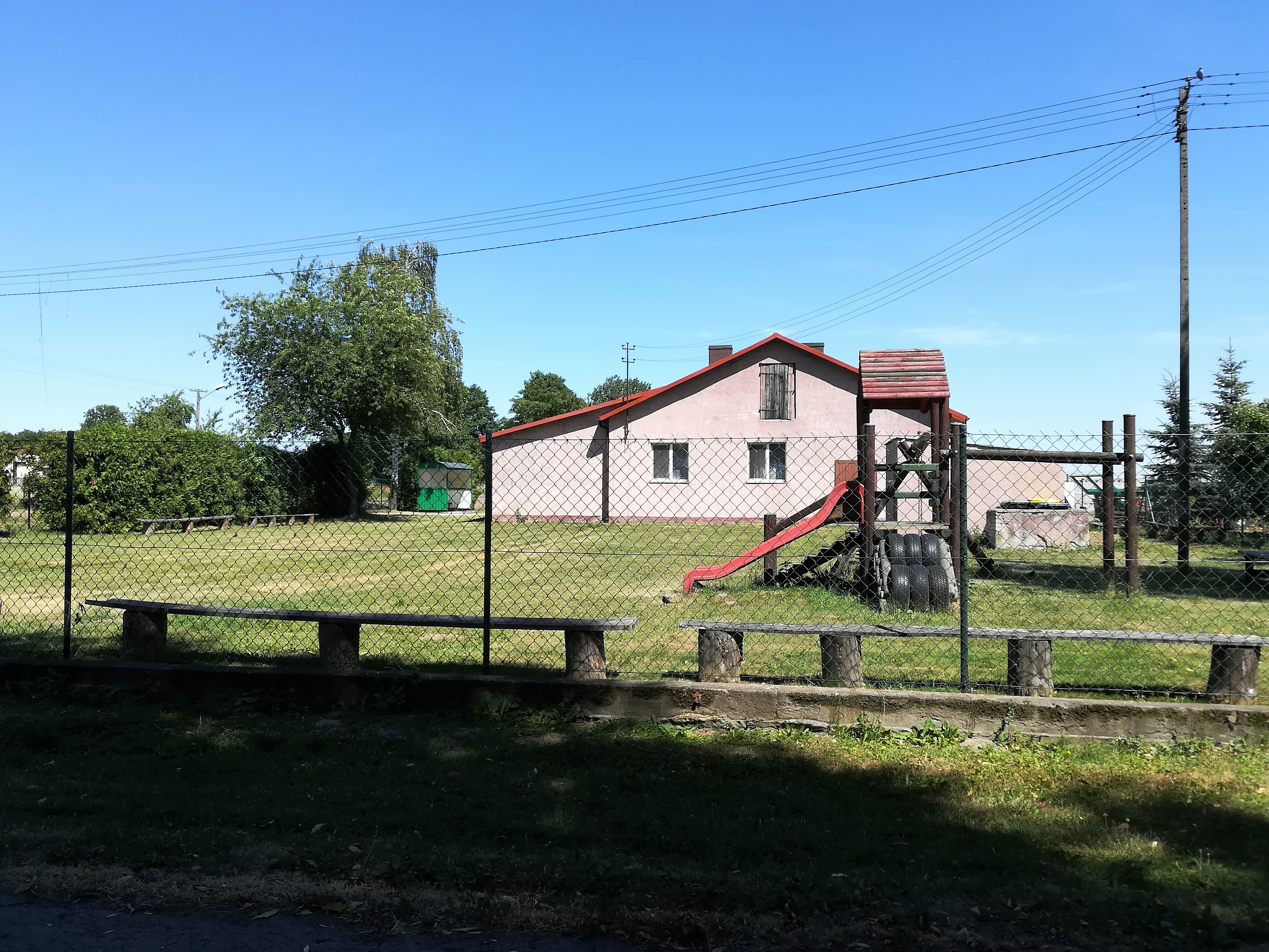
- Playground in Wymysłowo

- Location within Poland
- Coordinates: 52°37′N 16°45′E
- Country: Poland
- Voivodeship: Greater Poland
- County: Oborniki
- Gmina: Oborniki

Wymysłowo [vɨmɨˈswɔvɔ] is a village in the administrative district of Gmina Oborniki, within Oborniki County, Greater Poland Voivodeship, in west-central Poland.
