= Nowołoskoniec =

- Village
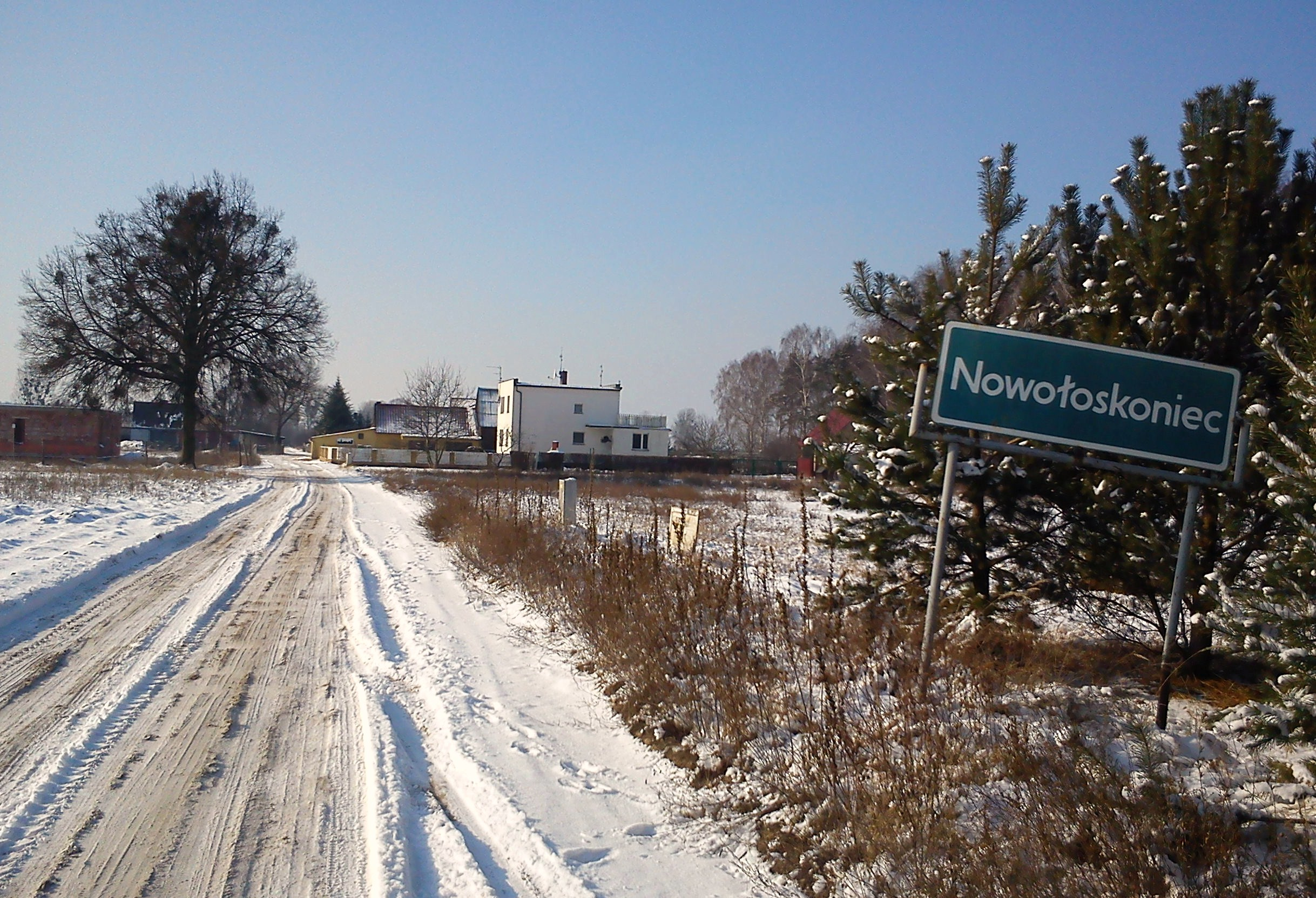
- Entering Nowołoskoniec

- Location within Poland
- Coordinates: 52°41′5″N 16°45′38″E
- Country: Poland
- Voivodeship: Greater Poland
- County: Oborniki
- Gmina: Oborniki

Nowołoskoniec [nɔvɔwɔsˈkɔɲɛt͡s] is a village in the administrative district of Gmina Oborniki, within Oborniki County, Greater Poland Voivodeship, in west-central Poland.
