= Uścikowo, Greater Poland Voivodeship =

Uścikowo
- Village
- Location within Poland
- Coordinates: 52°39′N 16°45′E
- Country: Poland
- Voivodeship: Greater Poland
- County: Oborniki
- Gmina: Oborniki

Uścikowo [uɕt͡ɕiˈkɔvɔ] is a village in the administrative district of Gmina Oborniki, within Oborniki County, Greater Poland Voivodeship, in west-central Poland.
