= Żerniki, Oborniki County =

Żerniki
- Village
- Location within Poland
- Coordinates: 52°38′32″N 16°54′43″E
- Country: Poland
- Voivodeship: Greater Poland
- County: Oborniki
- Gmina: Oborniki

Żerniki (Polish pronunciation: [ʐɛrˈɲikʲi]; German: Ziernik) is a village in the administrative district of Gmina Oborniki, within Oborniki County, Greater Poland Voivodeship, in west-central Poland.
