= Uścikowiec =

- Village
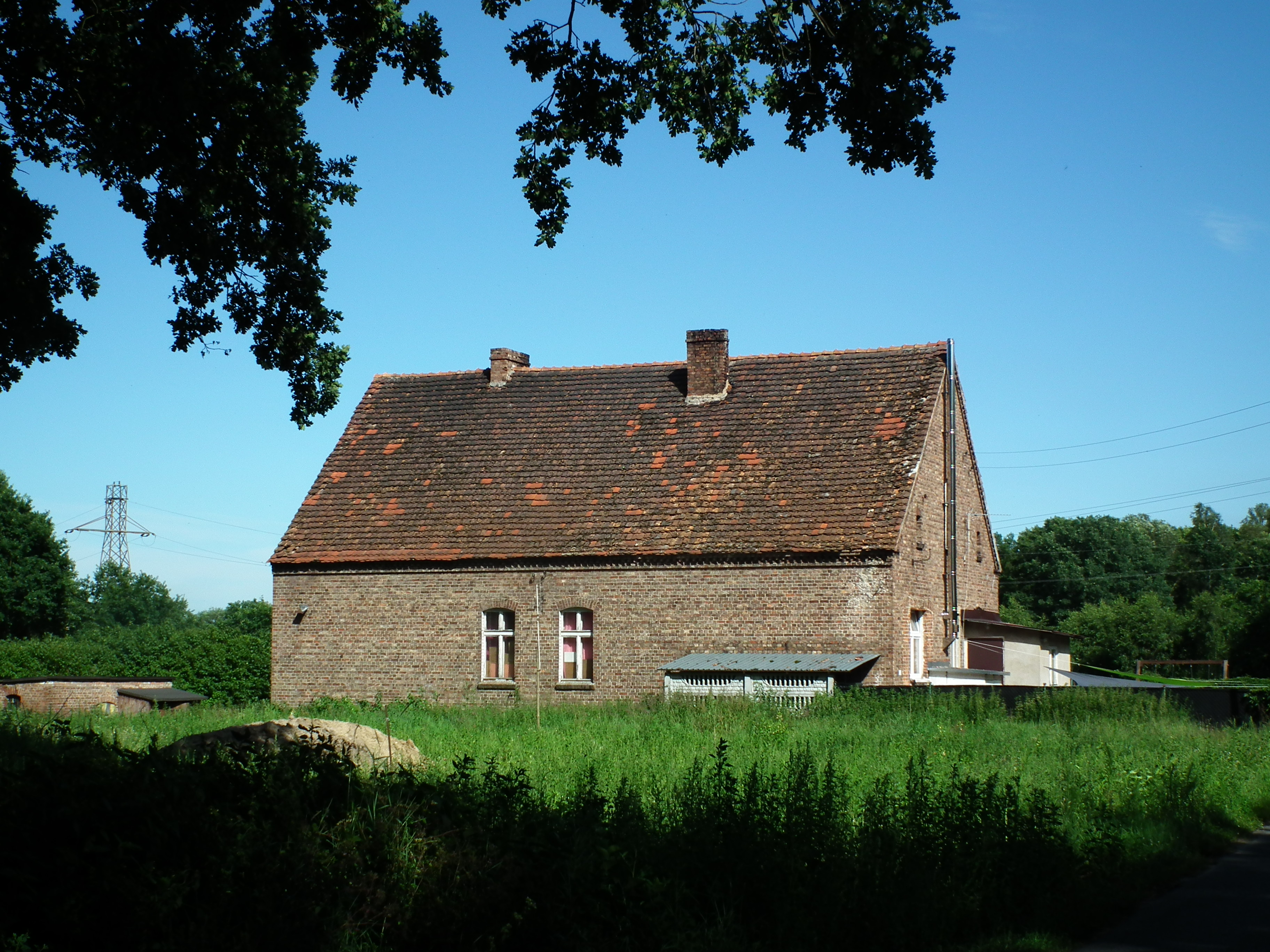
- Old school in Uścikowiec

- Location within Poland
- Coordinates: 52°40′N 16°46′E
- Country: Poland
- Voivodeship: Greater Poland
- County: Oborniki
- Gmina: Oborniki

Uścikowiec [uɕt͡ɕiˈkɔvjɛt͡s] is a village in the administrative district of Gmina Oborniki, within Oborniki County, Greater Poland Voivodeship, in west-central Poland.
