= Maniewo =

- Village
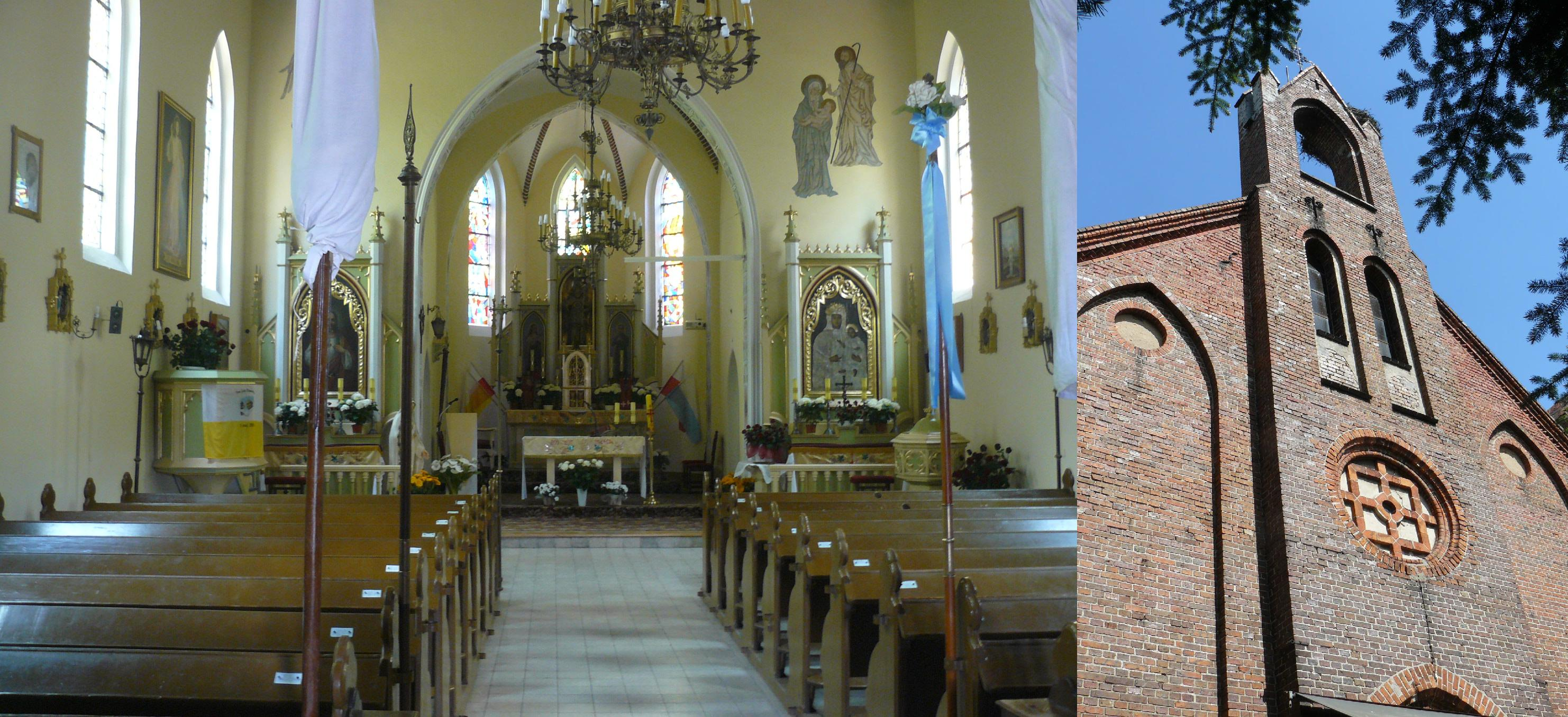
- Interior and exterior of Saint Nicholas church in Maniewo

- Location within Poland
- Coordinates: 52°36′N 16°52′E
- Country: Poland
- Voivodeship: Greater Poland
- County: Oborniki
- Gmina: Oborniki

Maniewo [maˈɲɛvɔ] is a village in the administrative district of Gmina Oborniki, within Oborniki County, Greater Poland Voivodeship, in west-central Poland.
