= Ocieszyn =

- Village
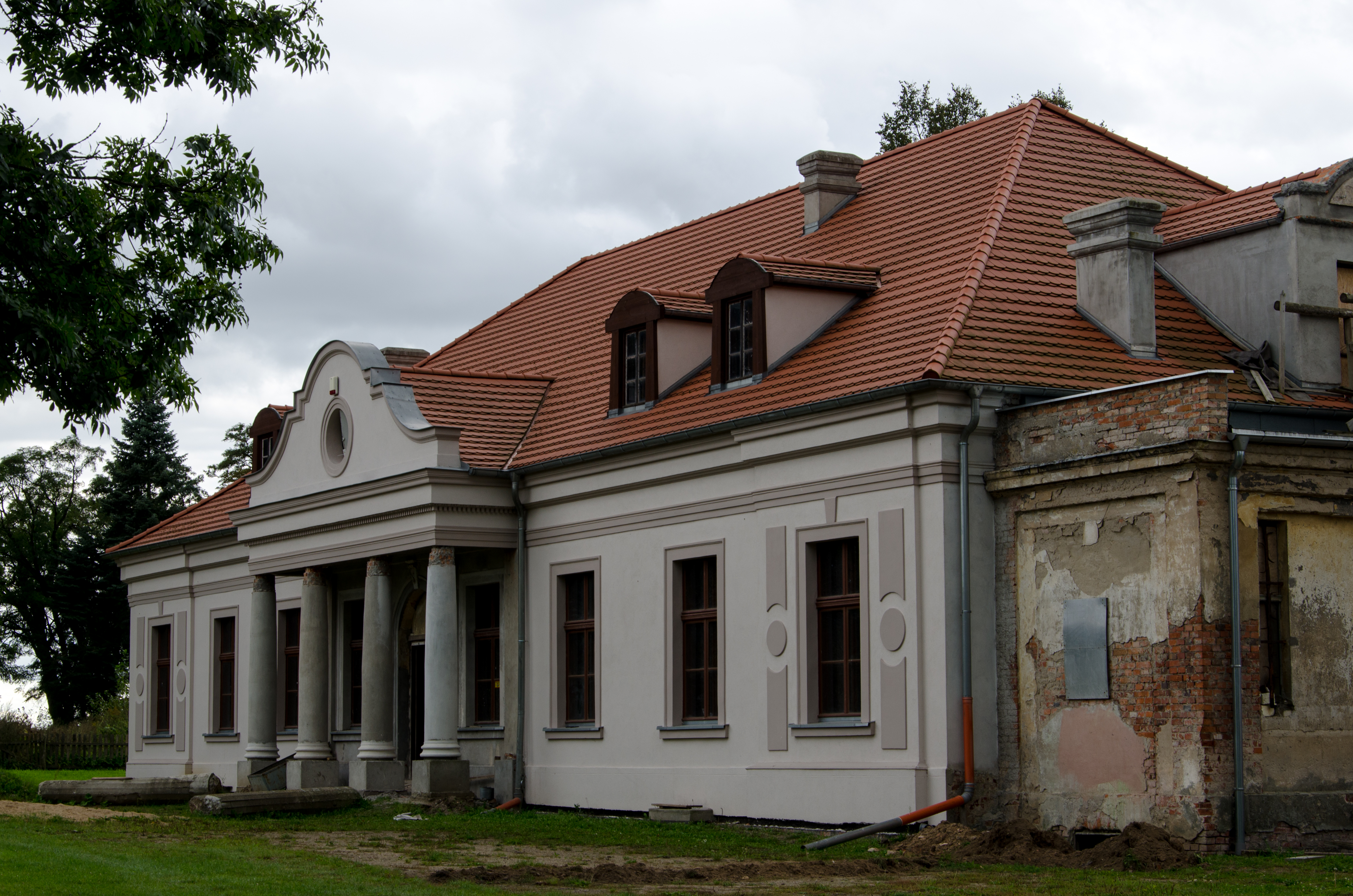
- Manor in Ocieszyn

- Location within Poland
- Coordinates: 52°36′N 16°50′E
- Country: Poland
- Voivodeship: Greater Poland
- County: Oborniki
- Gmina: Oborniki

Ocieszyn ([ɔˈt͡ɕɛʂɨn]; German: Augenfelde) is a village in the administrative district of Gmina Oborniki, within Oborniki County, Greater Poland Voivodeship, in west-central Poland.
