= Lulin, Oborniki County =

Lulin
- Village
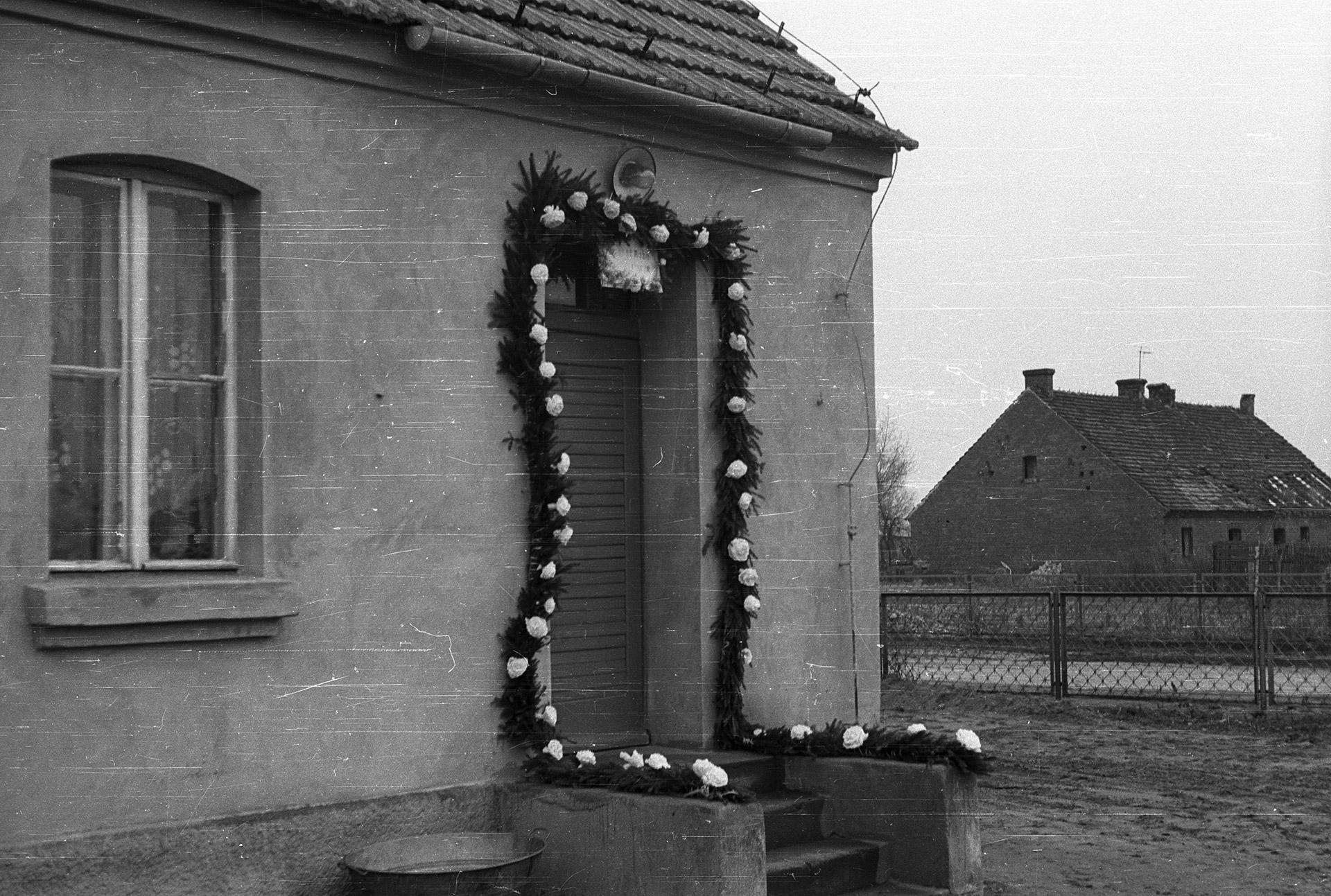
- House in Lulin, decorated for a wedding, dated 1980

- Location within Poland
- Coordinates: 52°34′47″N 16°42′35″E
- Country: Poland
- Voivodeship: Greater Poland
- County: Oborniki
- Gmina: Oborniki

Lulin ([ˈlulin]; German: Lulenau) is a village in the administrative district of Gmina Oborniki, within Oborniki County, Greater Poland Voivodeship, in west-central Poland.
