= Nowe Osowo =

- Village
- Location within Poland
- Coordinates: 52°37′50″N 16°38′27″E
- Country: Poland
- Voivodeship: Greater Poland
- County: Oborniki
- Gmina: Oborniki

Nowe Osowo [ˈnɔvɛ ɔˈsɔvɔ] is a village in the administrative district of Gmina Oborniki, within Oborniki County, Greater Poland Voivodeship, in west-central Poland.
