= Łukowo =

Łukowo may refer to the following places:

- Łukowo, Oborniki County in Greater Poland Voivodeship (west-central Poland)
- Łukowo, Wągrowiec County in Greater Poland Voivodeship (west-central Poland)
- Łukowo, Masovian Voivodeship (east-central Poland)
- Łukowo, Pomeranian Voivodeship (north Poland)

== See also ==
- Łuków, a city in eastern Poland
- Łuków County, whose seat is Łuków
- Lukovo (disambiguation)
