= Marszewiec =

- Village
- Location within Poland
- Coordinates: 52°40′8″N 16°54′47″E
- Country: Poland
- Voivodeship: Greater Poland
- County: Oborniki
- Gmina: Oborniki

Marszewiec [marˈʂɛvjɛt͡s] is a village in the administrative district of Gmina Oborniki, within Oborniki County, Greater Poland Voivodeship, in west-central Poland.
