= Oborniki =

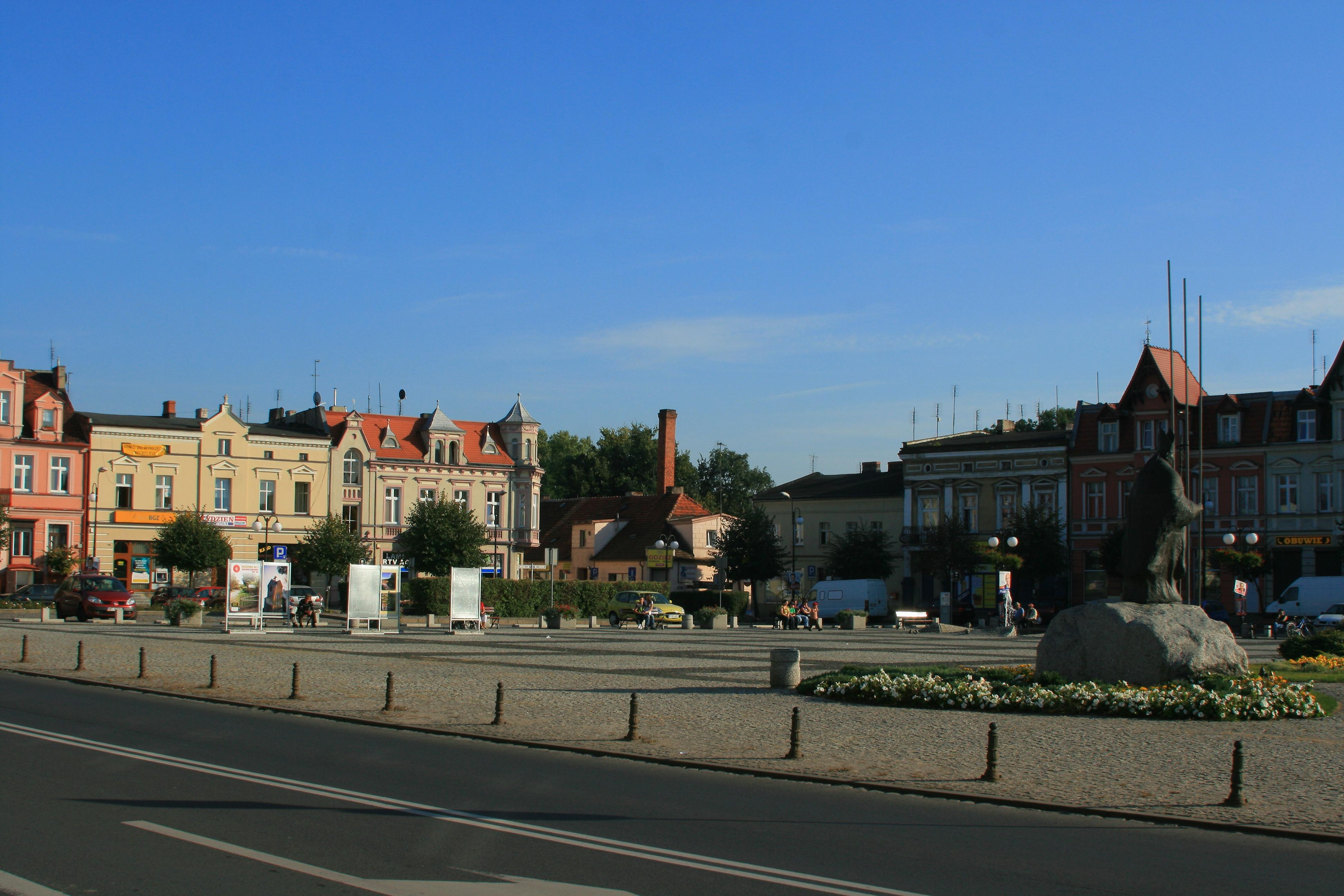
- Market Square (Rynek) in Oborniki

- Flag Coat of arms Brandmark

- Location within Poland
- Coordinates: 52°39′N 16°49′E
- Country: Poland
- Voivodeship: Greater Poland
- County: Oborniki
- Gmina: Oborniki
- Town rights: 13th century

Area
  - Total: 14.08 km^{2} (5.44 sq mi)

Population (2006)
  - Total: 17,850
  - Density: 1,268/km^{2} (3,283/sq mi)
- Time zone: UTC+1 (CET)
  - Summer (DST): UTC+2 (CEST)
- Postal code: 64-600
- Area code: +48 61
- License plates: POB
- Website: https://www.oborniki.pl/

Oborniki [ɔbɔrˈɲikʲi] is a town in west-central Poland, in Greater Poland Voivodeship, about 30 km (19 mi) north of Poznań. It is the capital of Oborniki County and of Gmina Oborniki. Its population is 18,176 (2005).

== History ==
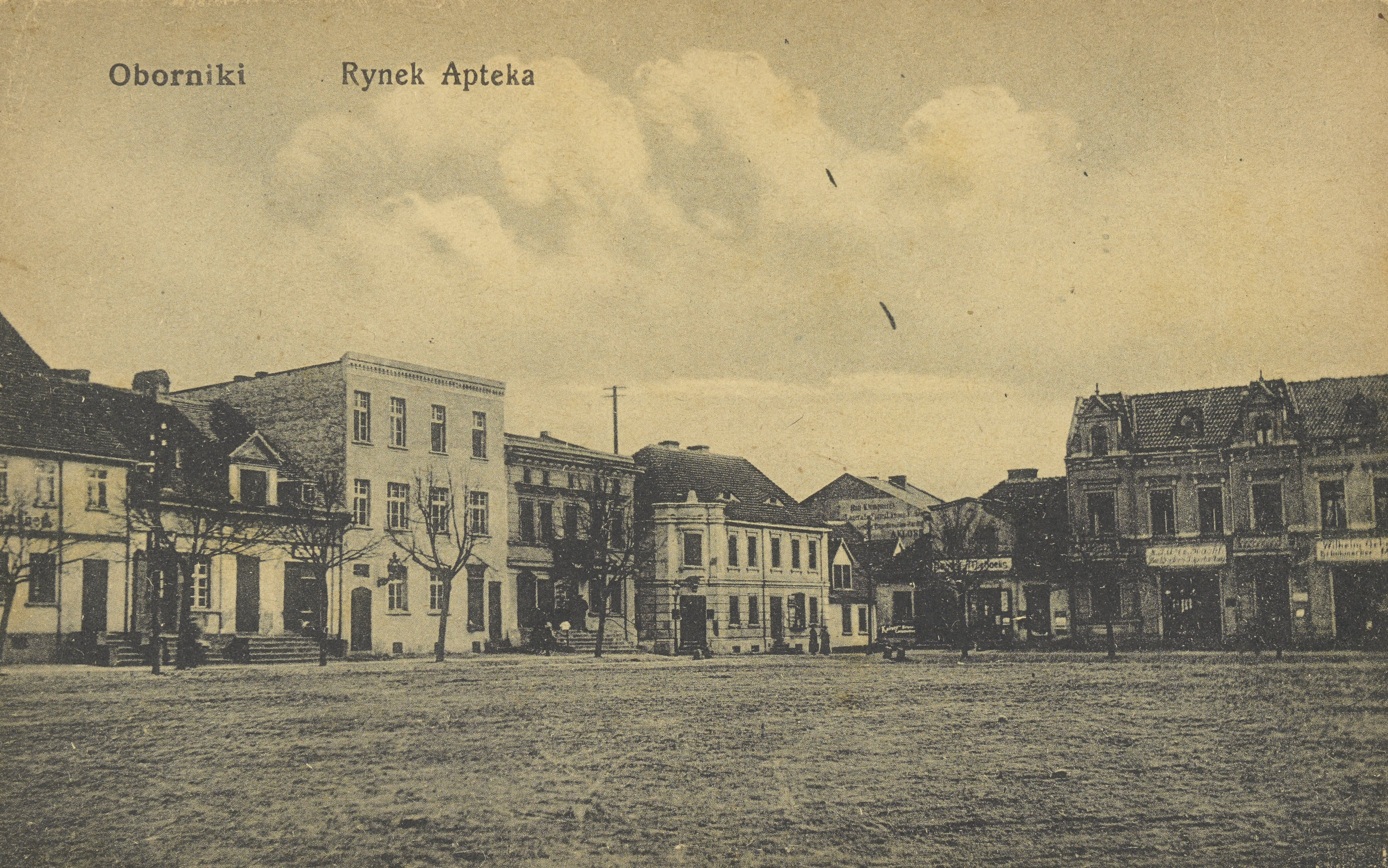
Rynek (Market Square) in the interbellum

Oborniki was granted town rights before 1292. Duke Bolesław the Pious founded a Franciscan monastery in Oborniki in the 13th century. It was a royal town of the Crown of the Kingdom of Poland, administratively located in the Poznań County in the Poznań Voivodeship in the Greater Poland Province. It was frequently visited by King Władysław II Jagiełło. As a result of the Second Partition of Poland in 1793, it was annexed by Prussia. After the successful Greater Poland uprising of 1806, it was regained by Poles and became part of the short-lived Duchy of Warsaw. In 1815 it was annexed by Prussia for the second time. The townspeople fought in the struggles for liberation of Poland, including the November Uprising, Greater Poland uprising (1848), January Uprising and the victorious post-World War I Greater Poland Uprising, as a result of which the town was integrated with the reestablished Polish state in 1919.

After the joint German-Soviet invasion of Poland, which started World War II in September 1939, the town was occupied by Germany until 1945. The first expelled Poles were former insurgents of the Greater Poland Uprising, and the expulsions were carried out in early December 1939. The expellees were held for several days in a transit camp in the nearby village of Kowanówko, where they were robbed of money and valuables, and then they were deported in freight trains to Sokołów Podlaski in the General Government in the more-eastern part of German-occupied Poland. In 1940, a transit camp for Poles expelled from various villages in the county was operated in the town. Some of the Poles expelled in 1940 from the nearby Chodzież and Szamotuły counties were enslaved as forced labour in the town's vicinity. The Grey Ranks printed Polish underground press in Oborniki, which was distributed throughout the county. In August 1944, the Germans carried out mass arrests of local members of the Home Army, the leading Polish underground resistance organization.

== Sights ==
Among the historic landmarks of Oborniki are:

- the Market Square filled with historic townhouses
- the Church of the Assumption, dating back to the 15th century
- the timber-framed Holy Cross church
- the Gothic Revival Saint Joseph Church

== Cuisine ==
Oborniki is one of the production sites of the Greater Poland liliput cheese (ser liliput wielkopolski), a traditional regional Polish cheese, protected as a traditional food by the Ministry of Agriculture and Rural Development of Poland.

== Sports ==
The local football team is Sparta Oborniki. It competes in the lower leagues.

== People ==
- Herybert Menzel (1906–1945), German poet and writer

== International relations ==
Oborniki is twinned with:

- Herk-de-Stad, Belgium
- (Georgia (country)) Kobuleti, Georgia
- Lüchow, Germany
- Żejtun, Malta

== Gallery ==
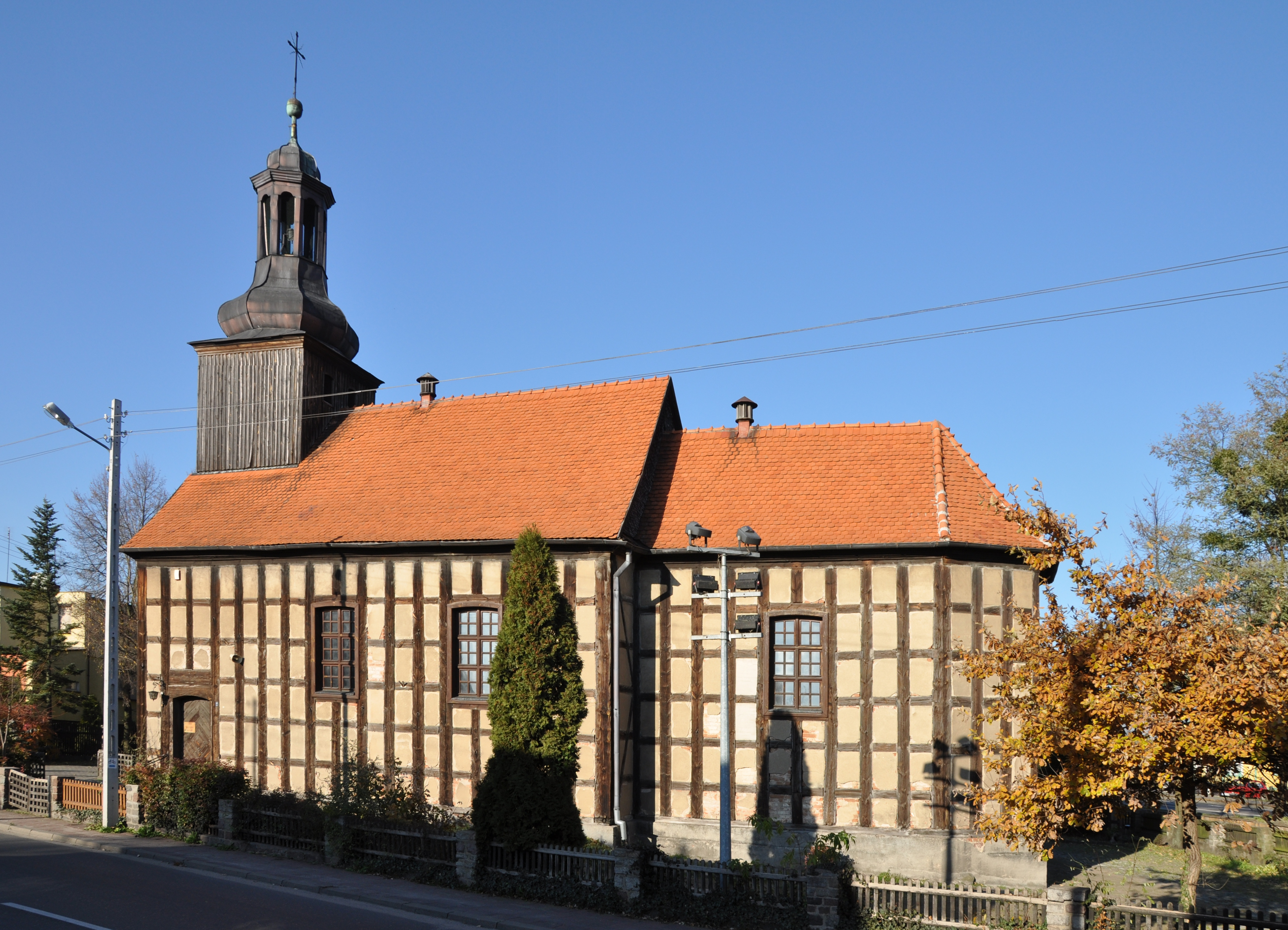
Holy Cross Church

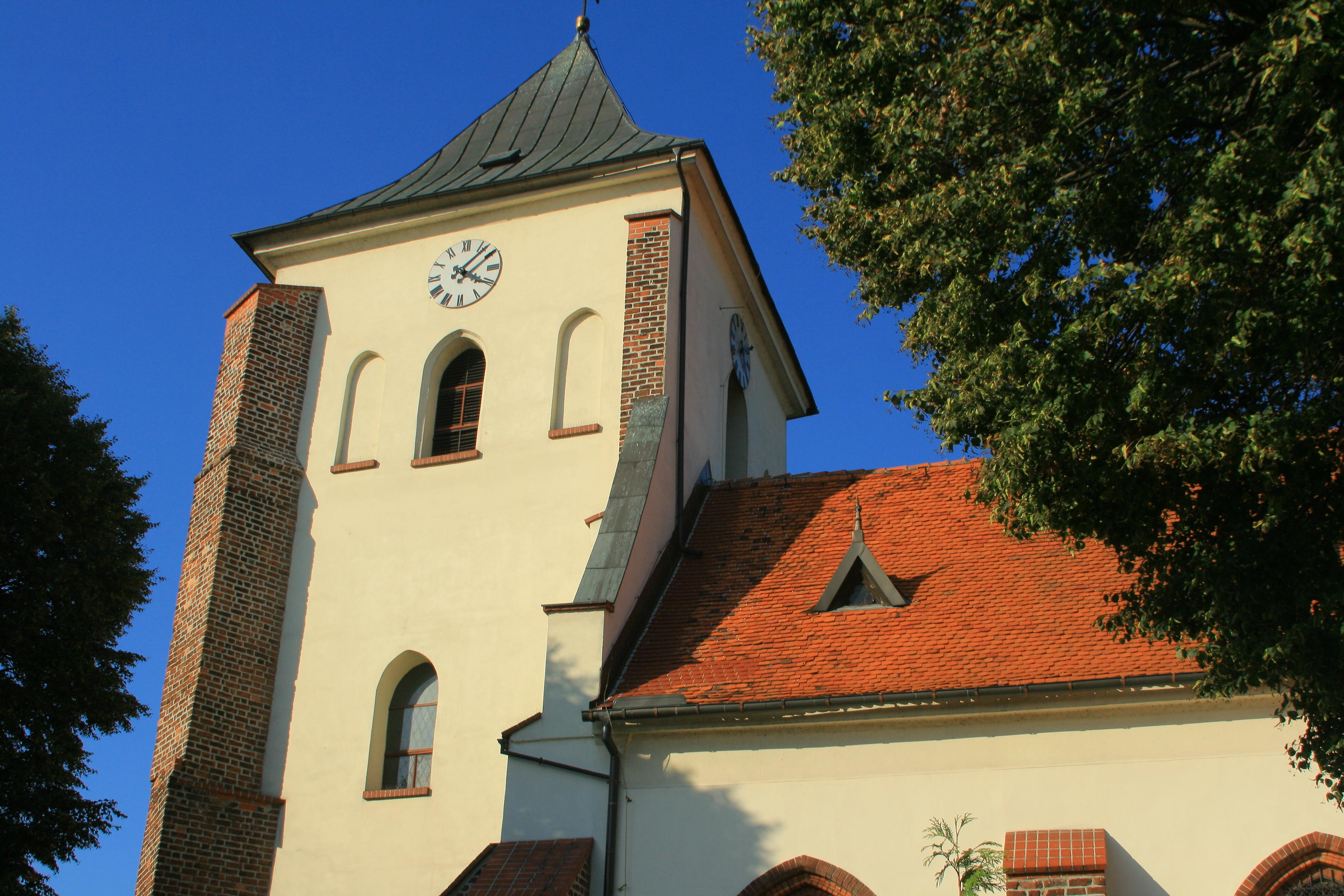
Church of the Assumption

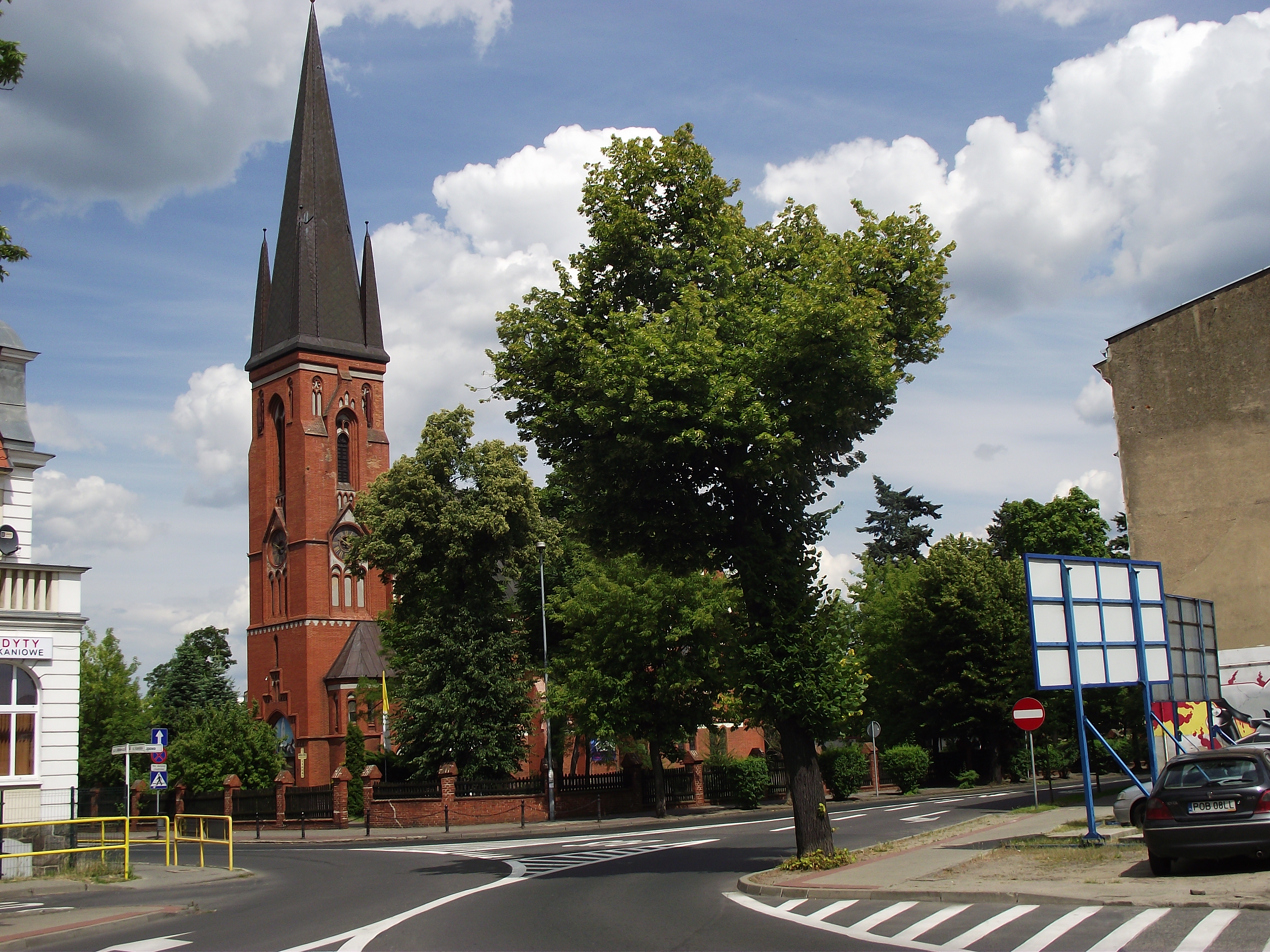
Saint Joseph church

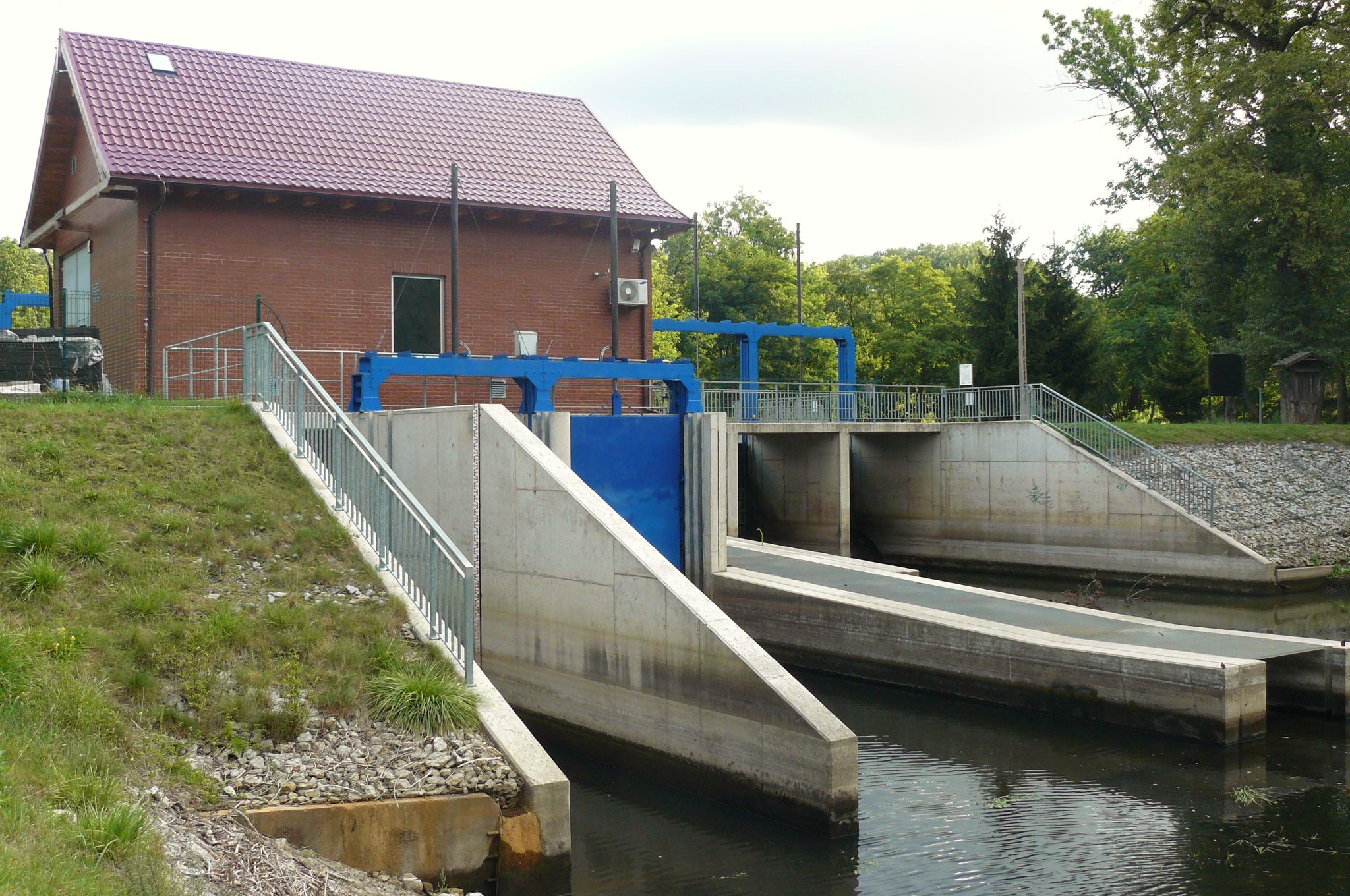
Hydroelectric power plant

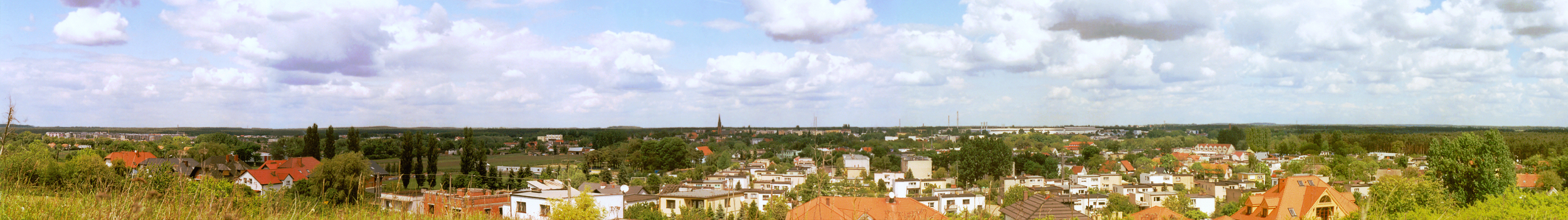
Panorama of the city
