= Bablin =

Bablin may refer to:

- Bablin, West Virginia, a community in Lewis County, West Virginia
- Bąblin, a village in Oborniki County, Poland
