= Chrustowo, Oborniki County =

Chrustowo
- Village
- Location within Poland
- Coordinates: 52°38′N 16°43′E
- Country: Poland
- Voivodeship: Greater Poland
- County: Oborniki
- Gmina: Oborniki

Chrustowo [xrusˈtɔvɔ] is a village in the administrative district of Gmina Oborniki, within Oborniki County, Greater Poland Voivodeship, in west-central Poland.
