= Niemieczkowo =

- Village
- Location within Poland
- Coordinates: 52°38′59″N 16°41′58″E
- Country: Poland
- Voivodeship: Greater Poland
- County: Oborniki
- Gmina: Oborniki
- First mentioned: 1361
- Time zone: UTC+1 (CET)
  - Summer (DST): UTC+2 (CEST)
- Vehicle registration: POB

Niemieczkowo [ɲɛmjɛt͡ʂˈkɔvɔ] is a village in the administrative district of Gmina Oborniki, within Oborniki County, Greater Poland Voivodeship, in west-central Poland.

== History ==
The oldest known mention of Niemieczkowo comes from 1361, when it was owned by local nobleman Jarota Niemieczkowski of Przosna coat of arms. Niemieczkowo was a private village of Polish nobility, administratively located in the Poznań County in the Poznań Voivodeship in the Greater Poland Province of the Polish Crown. It was owned by the Niemieczkowski and Raczyński families. There is a historic manor house of local nobility in the village.

During the German occupation of Poland (World War II), inhabitants of Niemieczkowo were among Poles massacred by the Germans on November 9, 1939, in Mędzisko as part of the Intelligenzaktion.
