= Wychowaniec =

- Village
- Location within Poland
- Coordinates: 52°36′41″N 16°40′05″E
- Country: Poland
- Voivodeship: Greater Poland
- County: Oborniki
- Gmina: Oborniki

Wychowaniec [vɨxɔˈvaɲɛt͡s] is a village in the administrative district of Gmina Oborniki, within Oborniki County, Greater Poland Voivodeship, in west-central Poland.
