= Żukowo, Greater Poland Voivodeship =

Żukowo
- Village
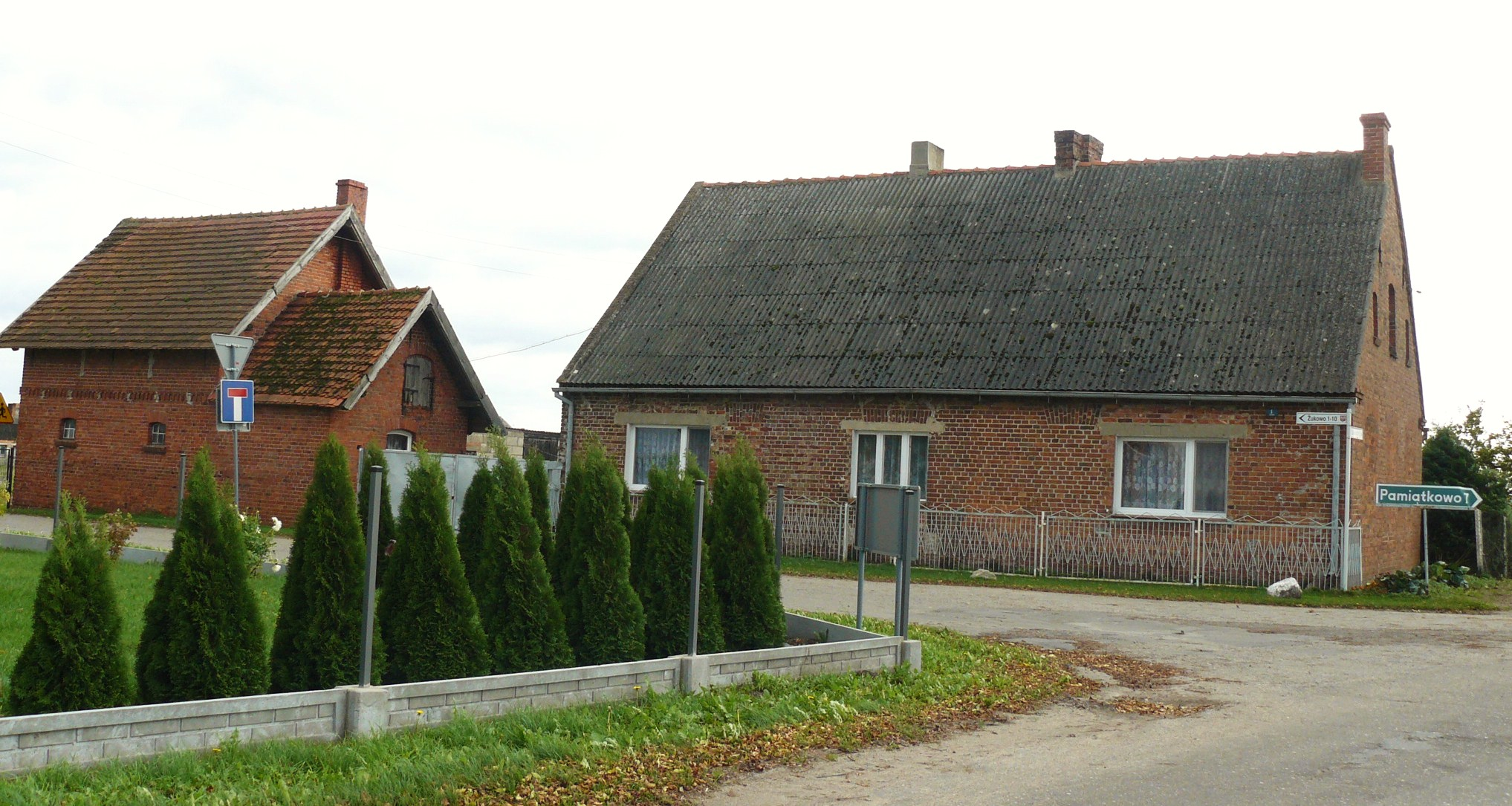
- Village centre of Żukowo

- Location within Poland
- Coordinates: 52°37′N 16°44′E
- Country: Poland
- Voivodeship: Greater Poland
- County: Oborniki
- Gmina: Oborniki

Żukowo [ʐuˈkɔvɔ] is a village in the administrative district of Gmina Oborniki, within Oborniki County, Greater Poland Voivodeship, in west-central Poland.
