= Objezierze, Greater Poland Voivodeship =

Objezierze
- Village
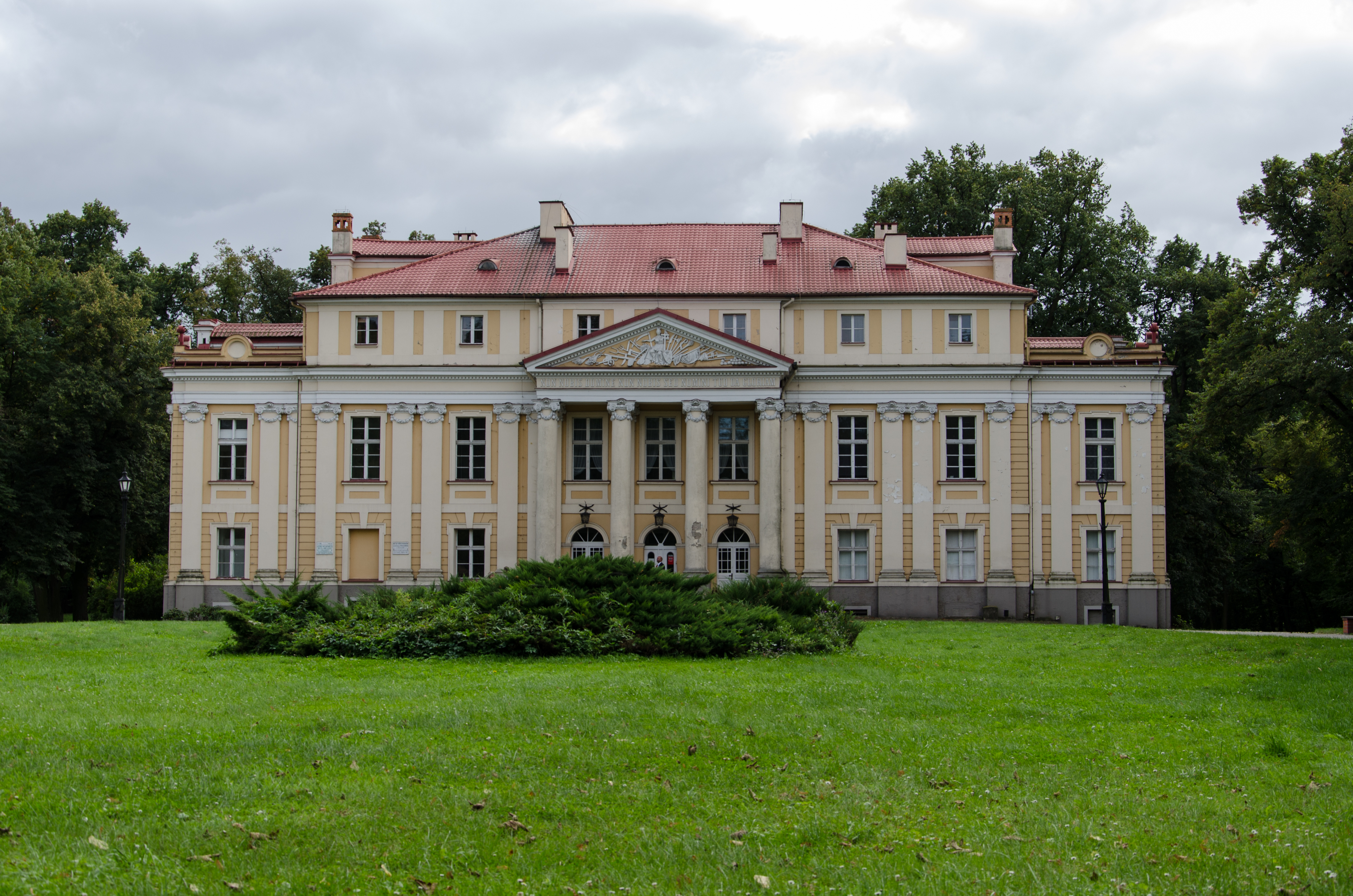
- Palace in Objezierze

- Location within Poland
- Coordinates: 52°36′17″N 16°45′46″E
- Country: Poland
- Voivodeship: Greater Poland
- County: Oborniki
- Gmina: Oborniki
- Population: 960

Objezierze [ɔbjɛˈʑɛʐɛ] is a village in the administrative district of Gmina Oborniki, within Oborniki County, Greater Poland Voivodeship, in west-central Poland.
