= Gołębowo =

- Village
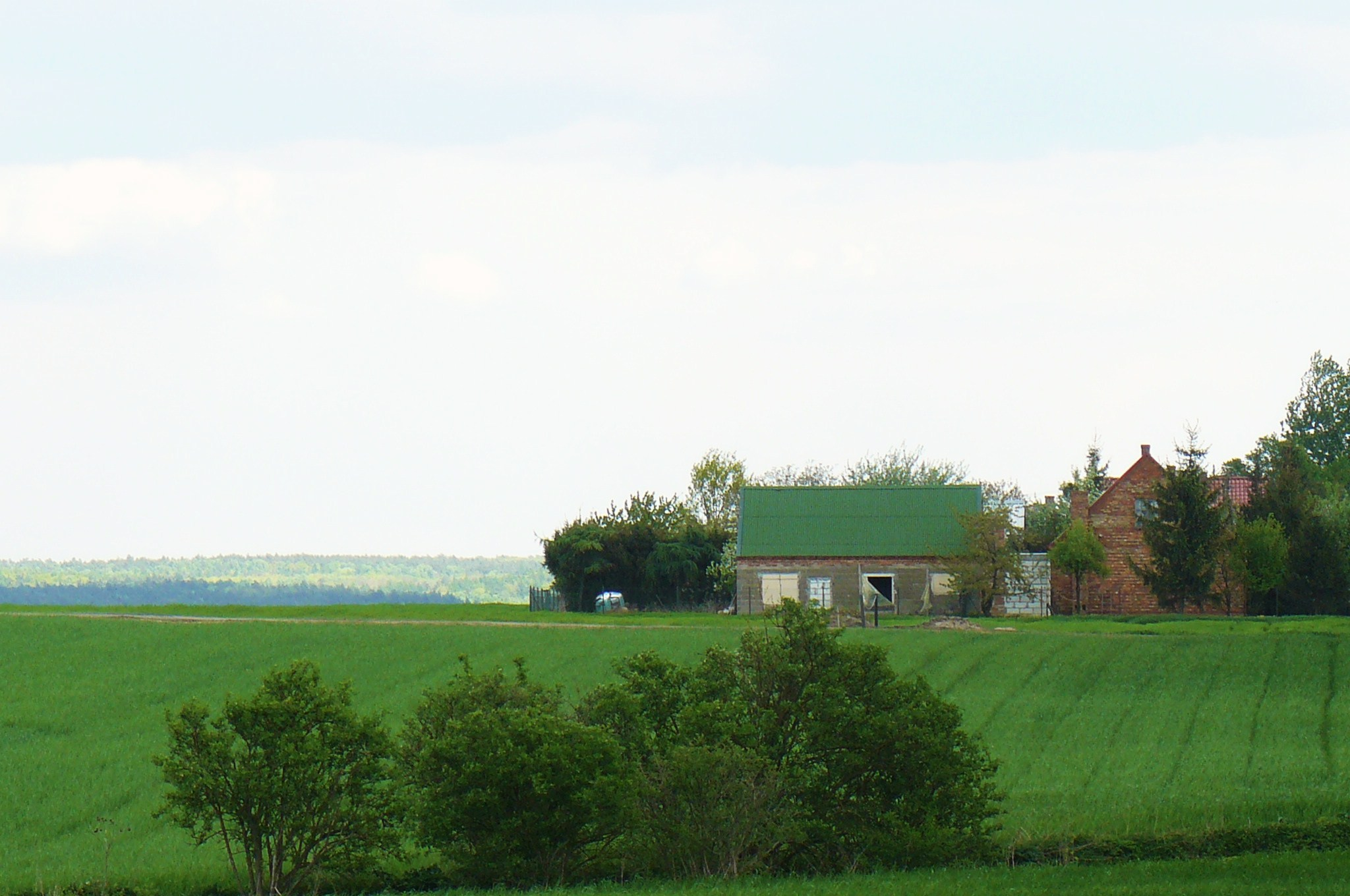
- Farm in Gołębowo

- Location within Poland
- Coordinates: 52°36′27″N 16°51′21″E
- Country: Poland
- Voivodeship: Greater Poland
- County: Oborniki
- Gmina: Oborniki

Gołębowo [ɡɔwɛmˈbɔvɔ] is a village in the administrative district of Gmina Oborniki, within Oborniki County, Greater Poland Voivodeship, in west-central Poland.
