= Sepno, Oborniki County =

Sepno
- Village
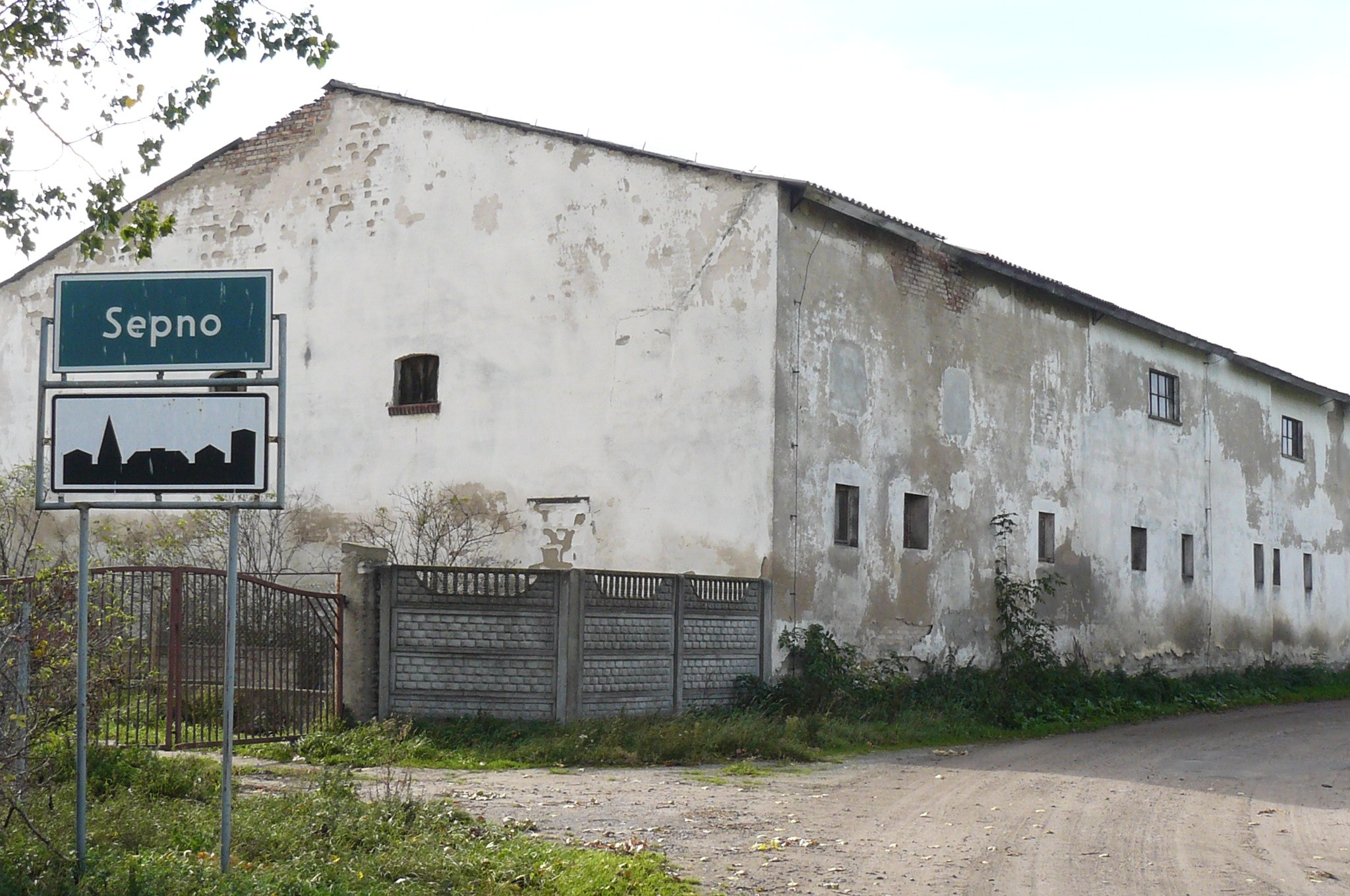
- Entering Sepno

- Location within Poland
- Coordinates: 52°33′15″N 16°46′32″E
- Country: Poland
- Voivodeship: Greater Poland
- County: Oborniki
- Gmina: Oborniki

Sepno [ˈsɛpnɔ] is a village in the administrative district of Gmina Oborniki, within Oborniki County, Greater Poland Voivodeship, in west-central Poland.
