= Słonawy, Greater Poland Voivodeship =

Słonawy
- Village
- Location within Poland
- Coordinates: 52°40′N 16°46′E
- Country: Poland
- Voivodeship: Greater Poland
- County: Oborniki
- Gmina: Oborniki

Słonawy ([swɔˈnavɨ]; German: Rotenstein) is a village in the administrative district of Gmina Oborniki, within Oborniki County, Greater Poland Voivodeship, in west-central Poland.
