= Antonin, Oborniki County =

Antonin
- Village
- Location within Poland
- Coordinates: 52°36′48″N 16°50′5″E
- Country: Poland
- Voivodeship: Greater Poland
- County: Oborniki
- Gmina: Oborniki

Antonin (Polish pronunciation: [anˈtɔɲin]) is a village in the administrative district of Gmina Oborniki, within Oborniki County, Greater Poland Voivodeship, in west-central Poland.
