= Wypalanki, Oborniki County =

Wypalanki
- Village
- Location within Poland
- Coordinates: 52°43′N 16°40′E
- Country: Poland
- Voivodeship: Greater Poland
- County: Oborniki
- Gmina: Oborniki

Wypalanki ([vɨpaˈlanki]; German: Brand Forst) is a village in the administrative district of Gmina Oborniki, within Oborniki County, Greater Poland Voivodeship, in west-central Poland.
