= Popowo, Oborniki County =

Popowo
- Village
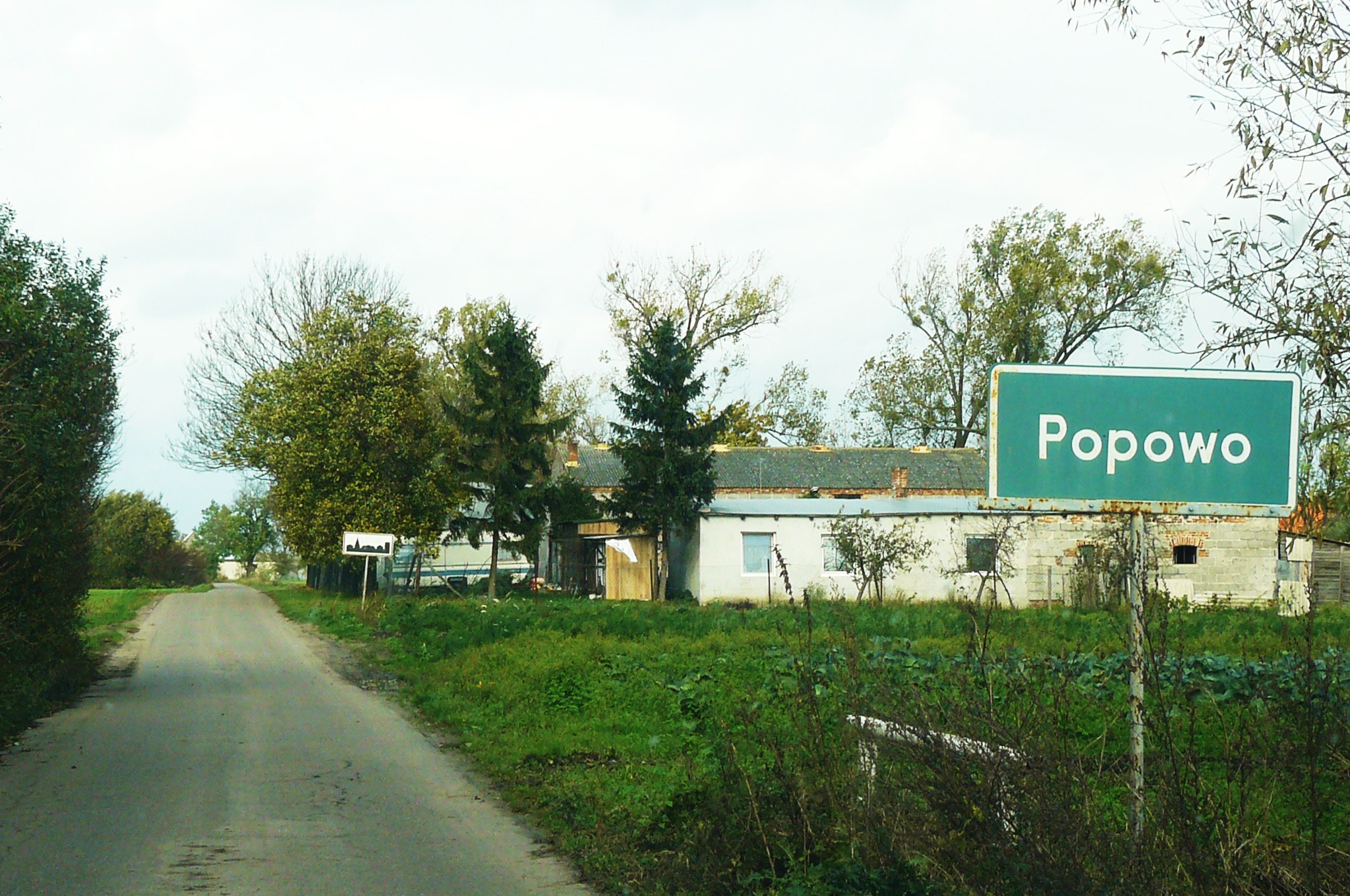
- Entering Popowo

- Location within Poland
- Coordinates: 52°36′31″N 16°39′09″E
- Country: Poland
- Voivodeship: Greater Poland
- County: Oborniki
- Gmina: Oborniki

Popowo ([pɔˈpɔvɔ]; German: Hinterfelde) is a village in the administrative district of Gmina Oborniki, within Oborniki County, Greater Poland Voivodeship, in west-central Poland.
