= Świerkówki =

- Village
- Location within Poland
- Coordinates: 52°34′48″N 16°50′06″E
- Country: Poland
- Voivodeship: Greater Poland
- County: Oborniki
- Gmina: Oborniki

Świerkówki (Polish: [ɕfjɛrˈkufkʲi]; German: Fichtenhof) is a village in the administrative district of Gmina Oborniki, within Oborniki County, Greater Poland Voivodeship, in west-central Poland.
