= Podlesie, Oborniki County =

Podlesie
- Village
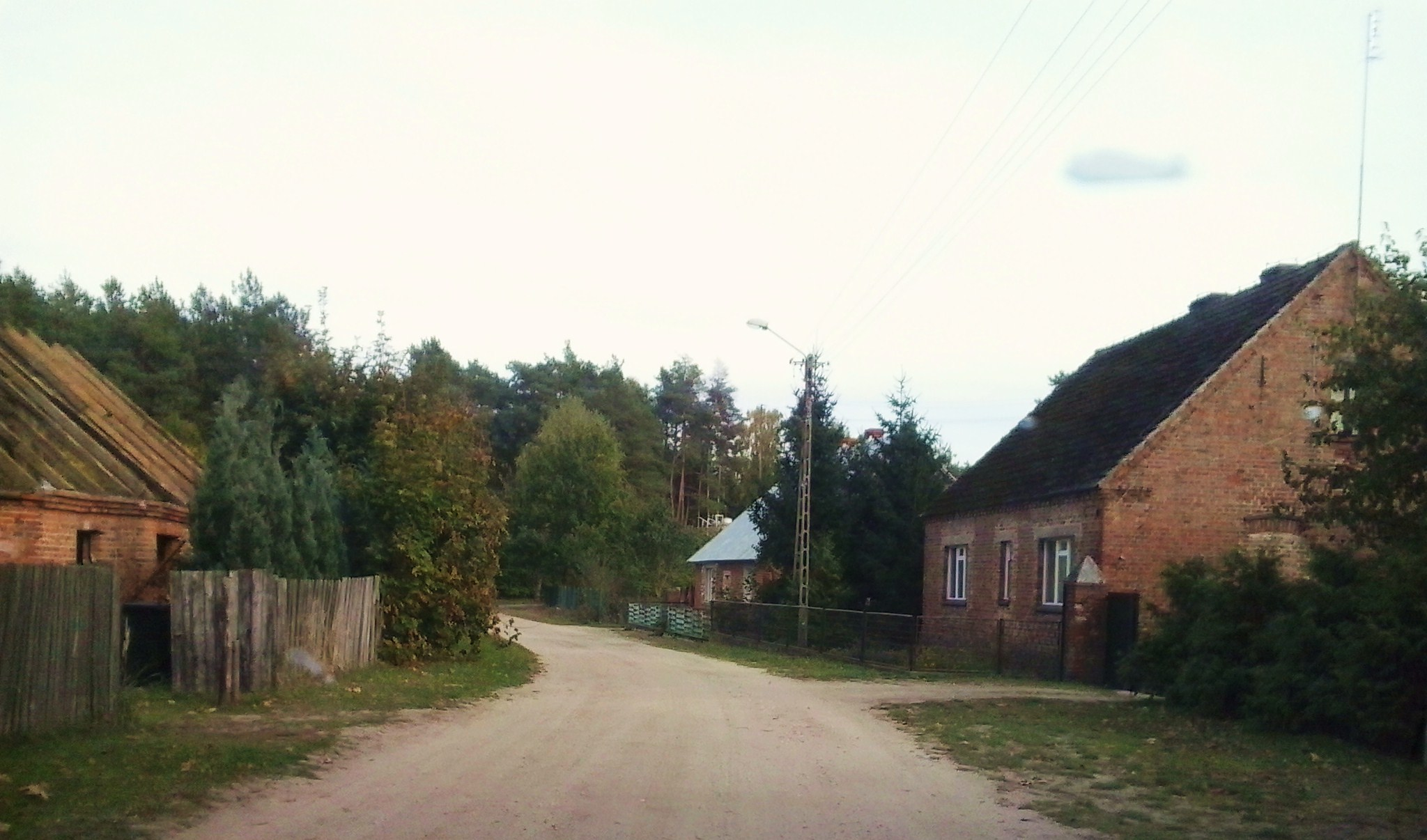
- Road in Podlesie

- Location within Poland
- Coordinates: 52°44′N 16°41′E
- Country: Poland
- Voivodeship: Greater Poland
- County: Oborniki
- Gmina: Oborniki

Podlesie ([pɔdˈlɛɕɛ]; German: Waldheide) is a village in the administrative district of Gmina Oborniki, within Oborniki County, Greater Poland Voivodeship, in west-central Poland.
