= Kowalewko, Oborniki County =

Kowalewko
- Village
- Location within Poland
- Coordinates: 52°35′24″N 16°46′44″E
- Country: Poland
- Voivodeship: Greater Poland
- County: Oborniki
- Gmina: Oborniki

Kowalewko ([kɔvaˈlɛfkɔ]; German: Schmiedenau) is a village in the administrative district of Gmina Oborniki, within Oborniki County, Greater Poland Voivodeship, in west-central Poland.
