= Bogdanowo =

Bogdanowo refers to the following places in Poland:

- Bogdanowo, Oborniki County
- Bogdanowo, Wągrowiec County
