= Bąblin =

- Village
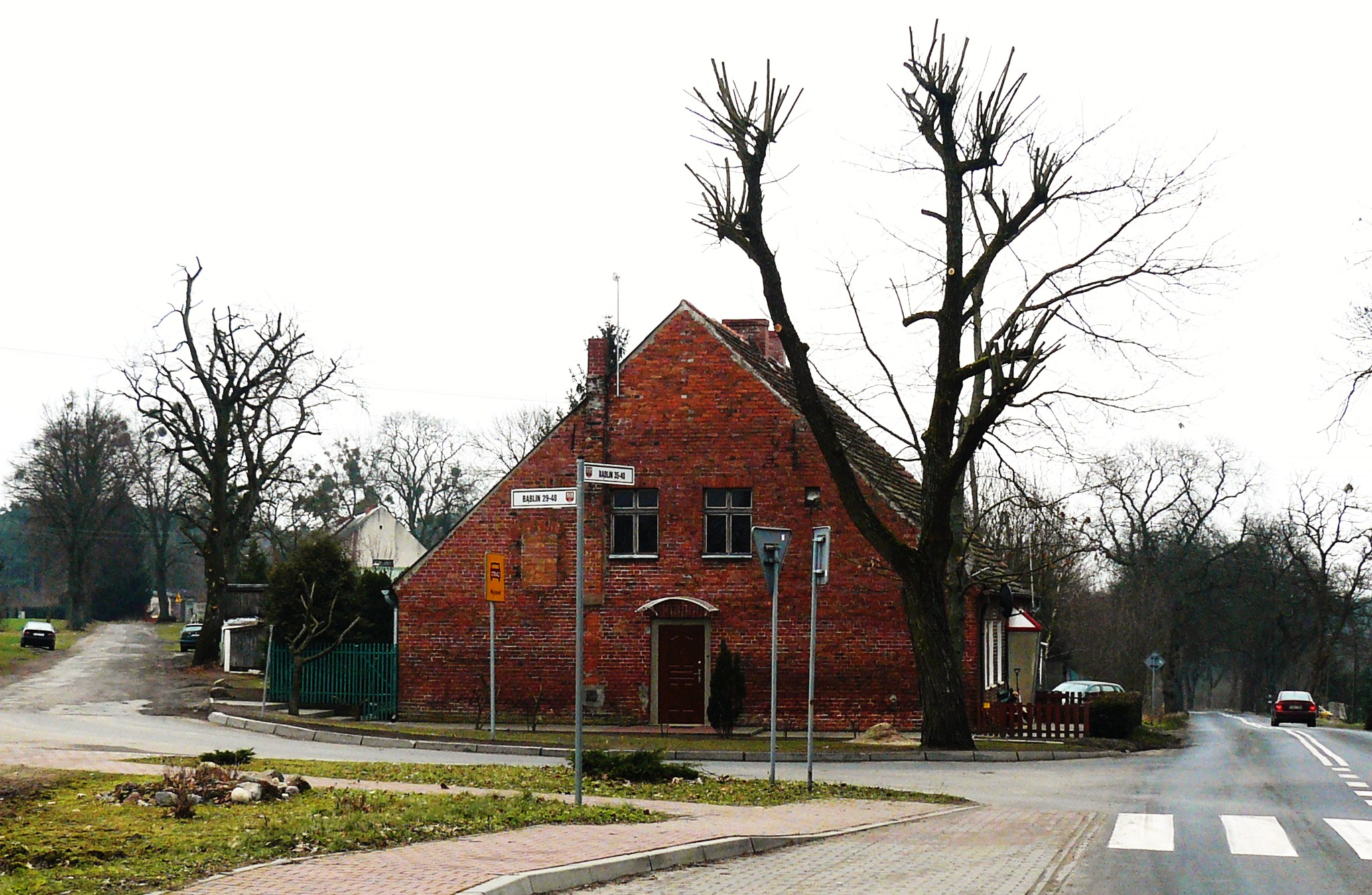
- Bąblin village centre

- Location within Poland
- Coordinates: 52°40′40″N 16°43′5″E
- Country: Poland
- Voivodeship: Greater Poland
- County: Oborniki
- Gmina: Oborniki

Bąblin [ˈbɔmblin] is a village in the administrative district of Gmina Oborniki, within Oborniki County, Greater Poland Voivodeship, in west-central Poland.
