= Nieczajna =

- Village
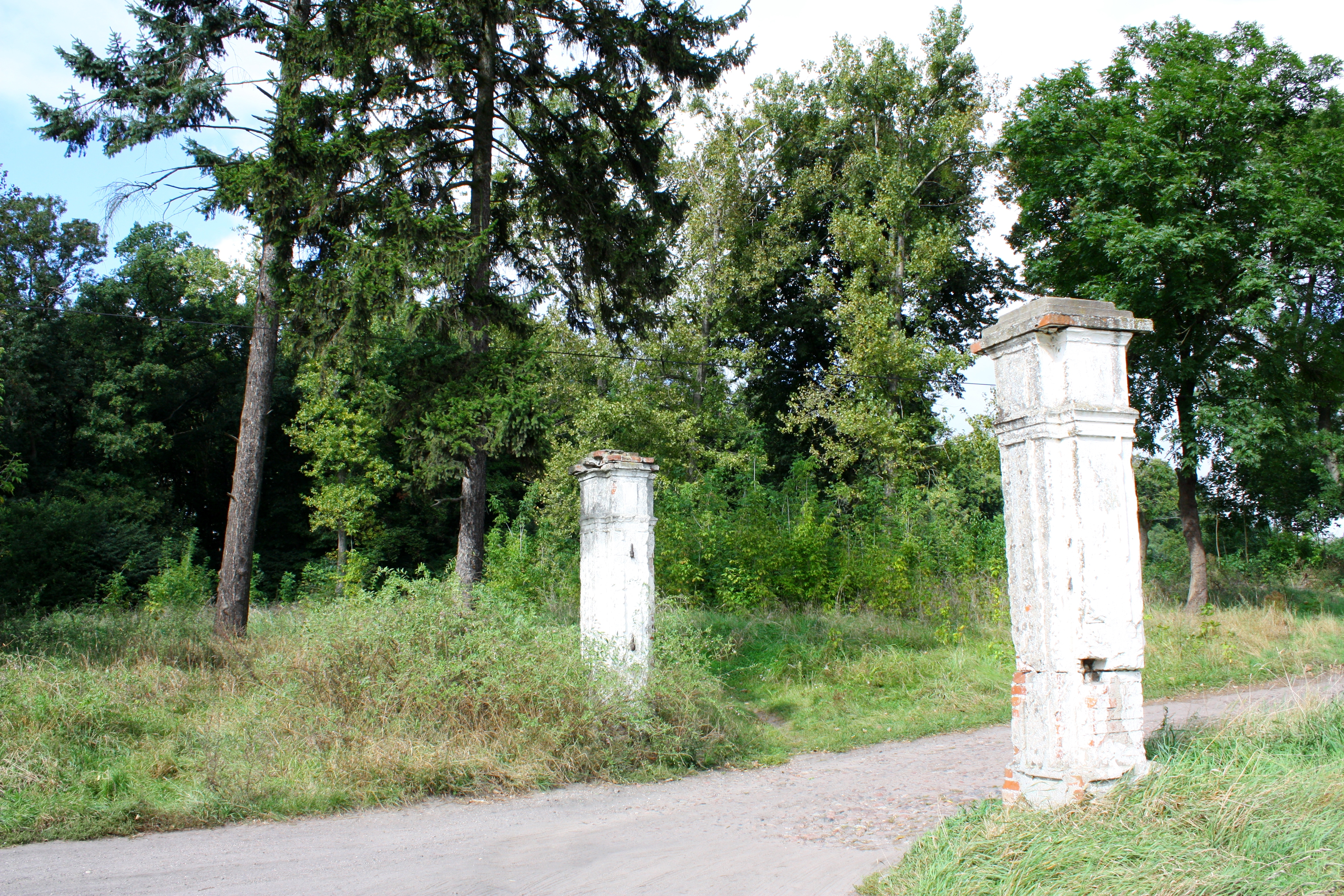
- Manor park in Nieczajna

- Location within Poland
- Coordinates: 52°35′N 16°46′E
- Country: Poland
- Voivodeship: Greater Poland
- County: Oborniki
- Gmina: Oborniki

Nieczajna ([ɲɛˈt͡ʂai̯na]; German: Niendorf)) is a village in the administrative district of Gmina Oborniki, within Oborniki County, Greater Poland Voivodeship, in west-central Poland.
