= Kowanówko =

- Village
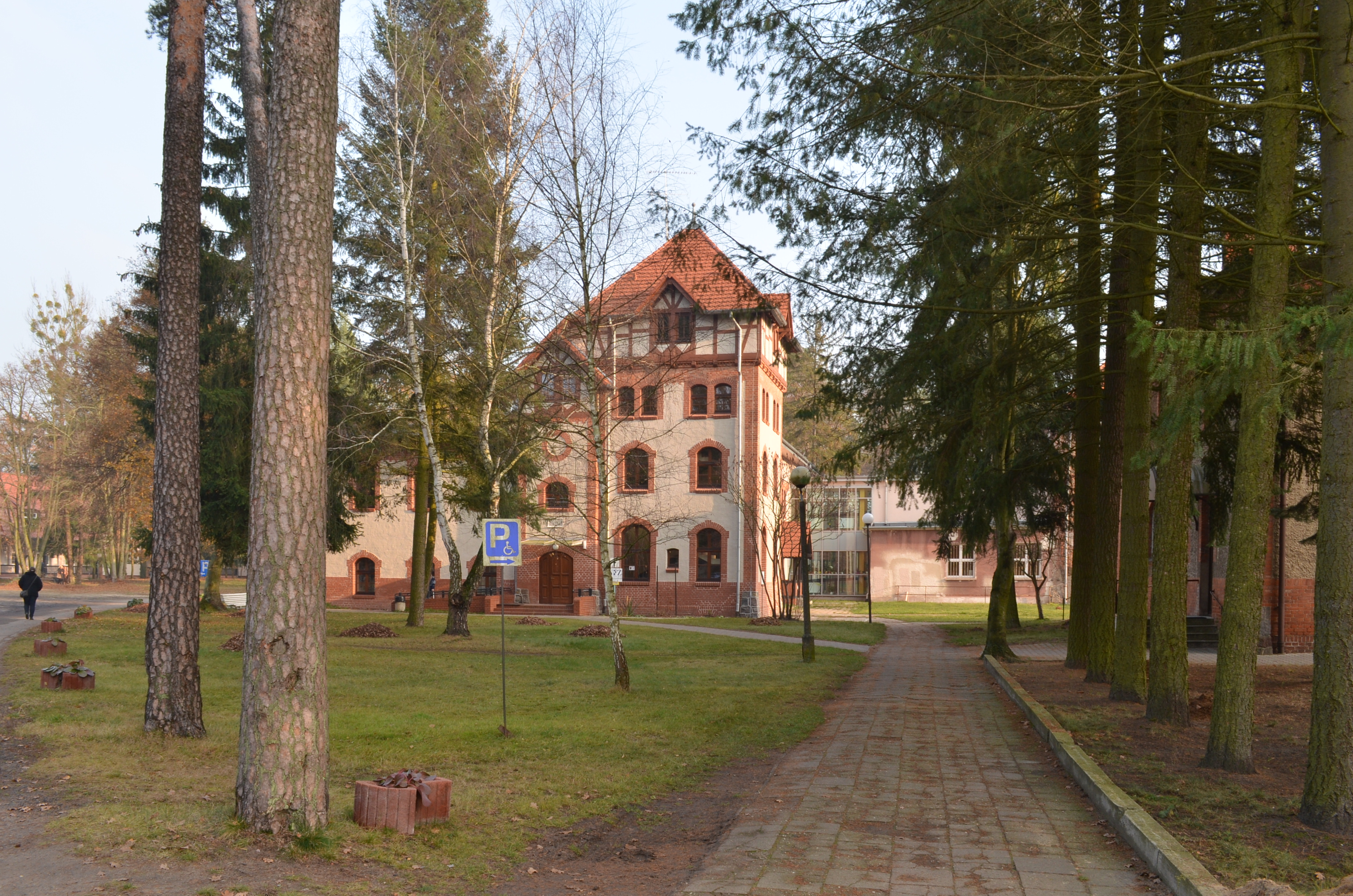
- Hospital administration building in Kowanówko

- Location within Poland
- Coordinates: 52°40′N 16°50′E
- Country: Poland
- Voivodeship: Greater Poland
- County: Oborniki
- Gmina: Oborniki
- First mentioned: 1356
- Population: 1,358
- Time zone: UTC+1 (CET)
  - Summer (DST): UTC+2 (CEST)
- Vehicle registration: POB

Kowanówko [kɔvaˈnufkɔ] is a village in the administrative district of Gmina Oborniki, within Oborniki County, Greater Poland Voivodeship, in west-central Poland.

== History ==
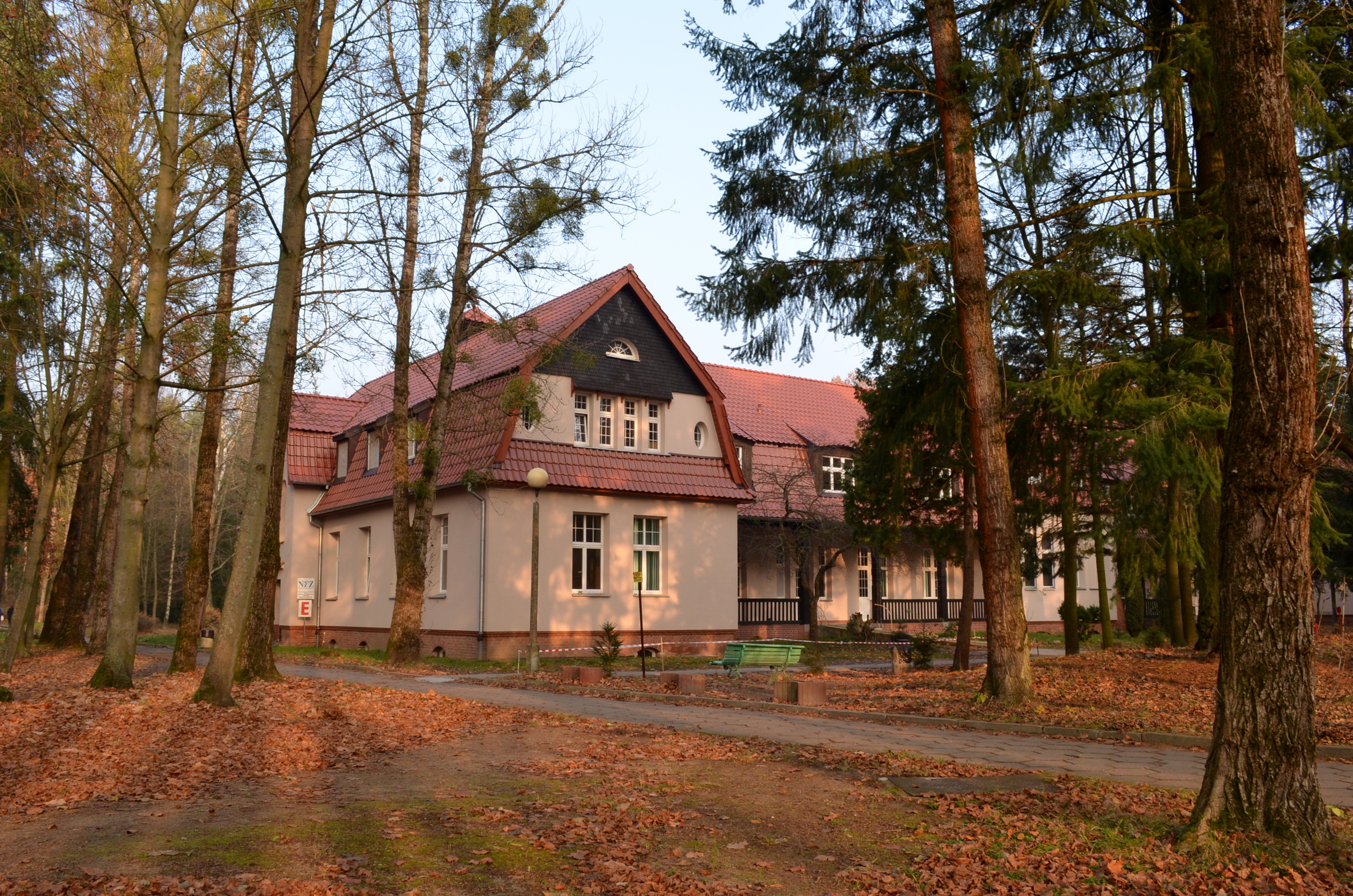
One of the historic buildings of the hospital complex

The oldest known mention of the village comes from 1356, when it was part of the Piast-ruled Kingdom of Poland. Kowanówko, in the past also known as Chowanówko, was a royal village of the Polish Crown, administratively located in the Poznań County in the Poznań Voivodeship in the Greater Poland Province. In 1857, Józef Żelazko established a psychiatric hospital in the village. Polish painter Stanisław Chlebowski died in the village in 1884.

After the joint German-Soviet invasion of Poland, which started World War II in September 1939, the village was occupied by Germany until 1945. A transit camp for Poles expelled from the county in 1939 was operated by Germany in the village. The expellees were held in the camp for several days, where they were robbed of money and valuables, and then they were deported in freight trains to Sokołów Podlaski in the General Government in the more eastern part of German-occupied Poland.
