= Łukowo, Oborniki County =

Łukowo
- Village
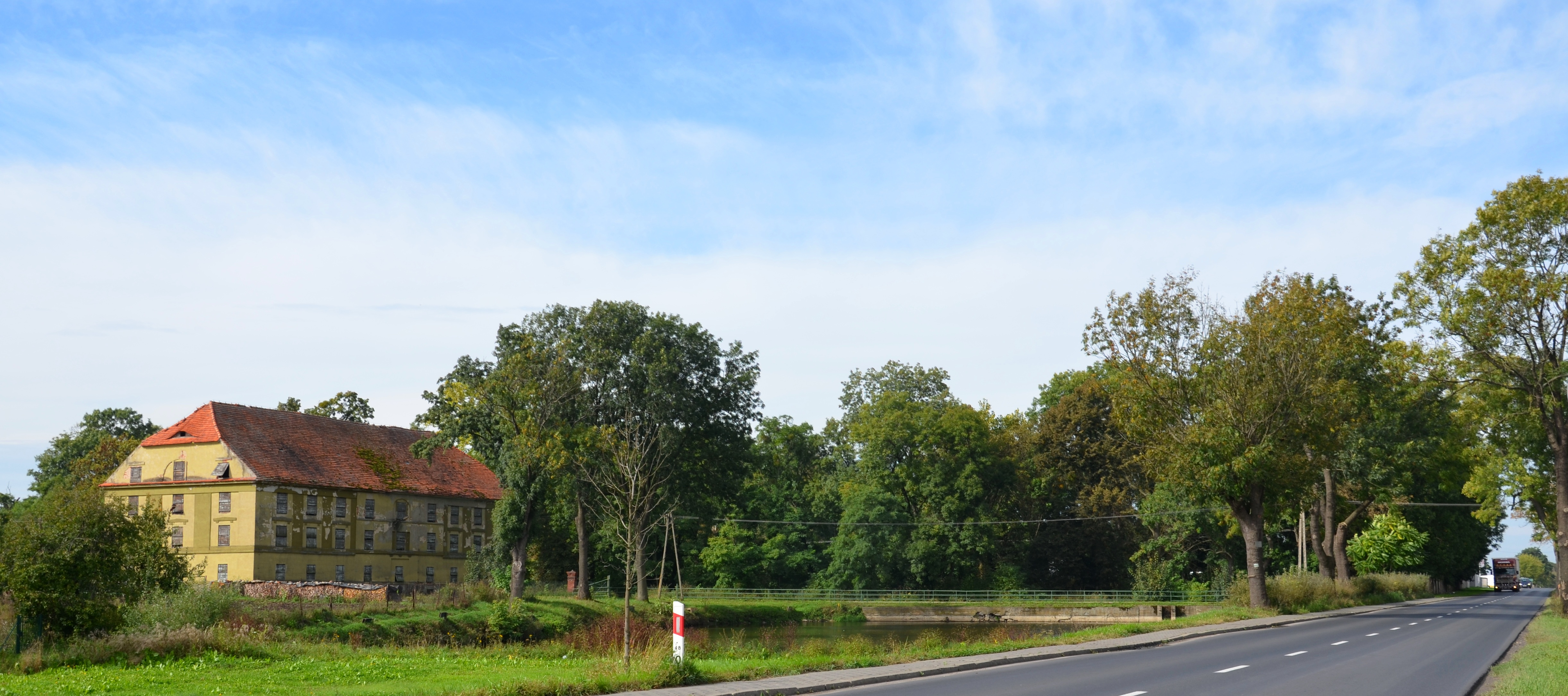
- Road in Łukowo, with an old storage building visible

- Location within Poland
- Coordinates: 52°38′N 16°53′E
- Country: Poland
- Voivodeship: Greater Poland
- County: Oborniki
- Gmina: Oborniki

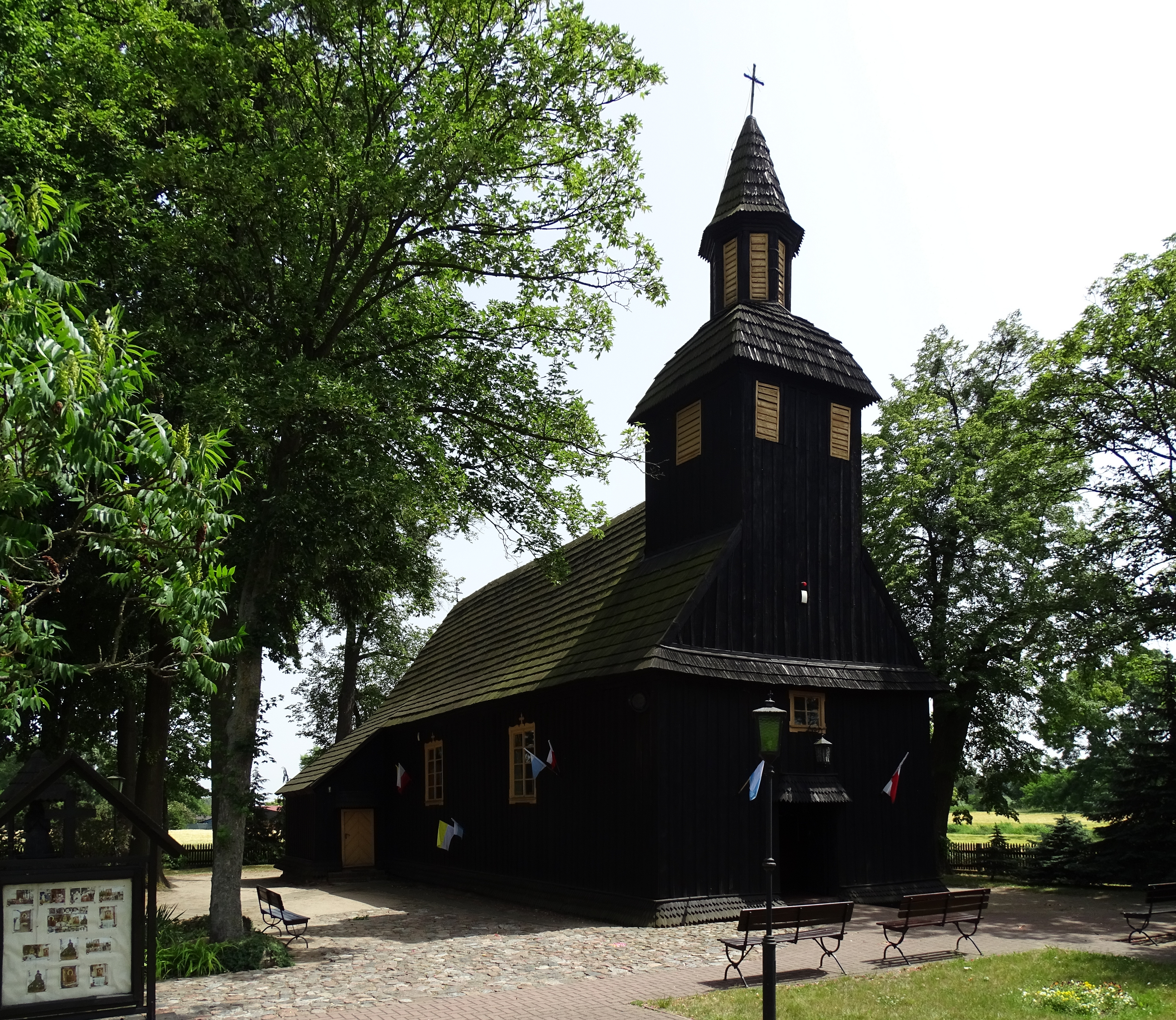
Parish church from 1780.

Łukowo [wuˈkɔvɔ] is a village in the administrative district of Gmina Oborniki, within Oborniki County, Greater Poland Voivodeship, in west-central Poland.
