= Bębnikąt, Greater Poland Voivodeship =

Bębnikąt
- Village
- Location within Poland
- Coordinates: 52°53′26″N 16°46′40″E
- Country: Poland
- Voivodeship: Greater Poland
- County: Oborniki
- Gmina: Oborniki

Bębnikąt [bɛmbˈnikɔnt] is a village in the administrative district of Gmina Oborniki, within Oborniki County, Greater Poland Voivodeship, in west-central Poland.
