= Gmina Oborniki =

Gmina Oborniki Oborniki Commune
- Gmina
- Flag Coat of arms
- Interactive map of Gmina Oborniki
- Coordinates (Oborniki): 52°39′N 16°49′E
- Country: Poland
- Voivodeship: Greater Poland
- County: Oborniki
- Seat: Oborniki

Area
  - Total: 340.16 km^{2} (131.34 sq mi)

Population (2006)
  - Total: 31,541
  - Density: 92.724/km^{2} (240.15/sq mi)
  - Urban: 17,850
  - Rural: 13,691
- Website: http://www.oborniki.pl/

Gmina Oborniki is an urban-rural gmina (administrative district) in Oborniki County, Greater Poland Voivodeship, in west-central Poland. Its seat is the town of Oborniki, which lies approximately 29 kilometres (18 mi) north of the regional capital Poznań.

The gmina covers an area of 340.16 square kilometres (131.3 sq mi), and as of 2006 its total population is 31,541 (out of which the population of Oborniki amounts to 17,850, and the population of the rural part of the gmina is 13,691).

== Villages ==
Apart from the town of Oborniki, Gmina Oborniki contains the villages and settlements of Antonin, Bąblin, Bąblinek, Bąbliniec, Bębnikąt, Bogdanowo, Chrustowo, Dąbrówka Leśna, Gołaszyn, Gołębowo, Górka, Kiszewko, Kiszewo, Kowalewko, Kowanówko, Kowanowo, Łukowo, Lulin, Maniewo, Marszewiec, Nieczajna, Niemieczkowo, Nowe Osowo, Nowołoskoniec, Objezierze, Ocieszyn, Pacholewo, Podlesie, Popówko, Popowo, Przeciwnica, Rożnowo, Sepno, Sławienko, Ślepuchowo, Słonawy, Stobnica, Świerkówki, Sycyn, Urbanie, Uścikowiec, Uścikowo, Wargowo, Wychowaniec, Wymysłowo, Wypalanki, Żerniki and Żukowo.

== Neighbouring gminas ==
Gmina Oborniki is bordered by the gminas of Murowana Goślina, Obrzycko, Połajewo, Rogoźno, Rokietnica, Ryczywół, Suchy Las and Szamotuły.
