= Bogdanowo, Oborniki County =

Bogdanowo
- Village
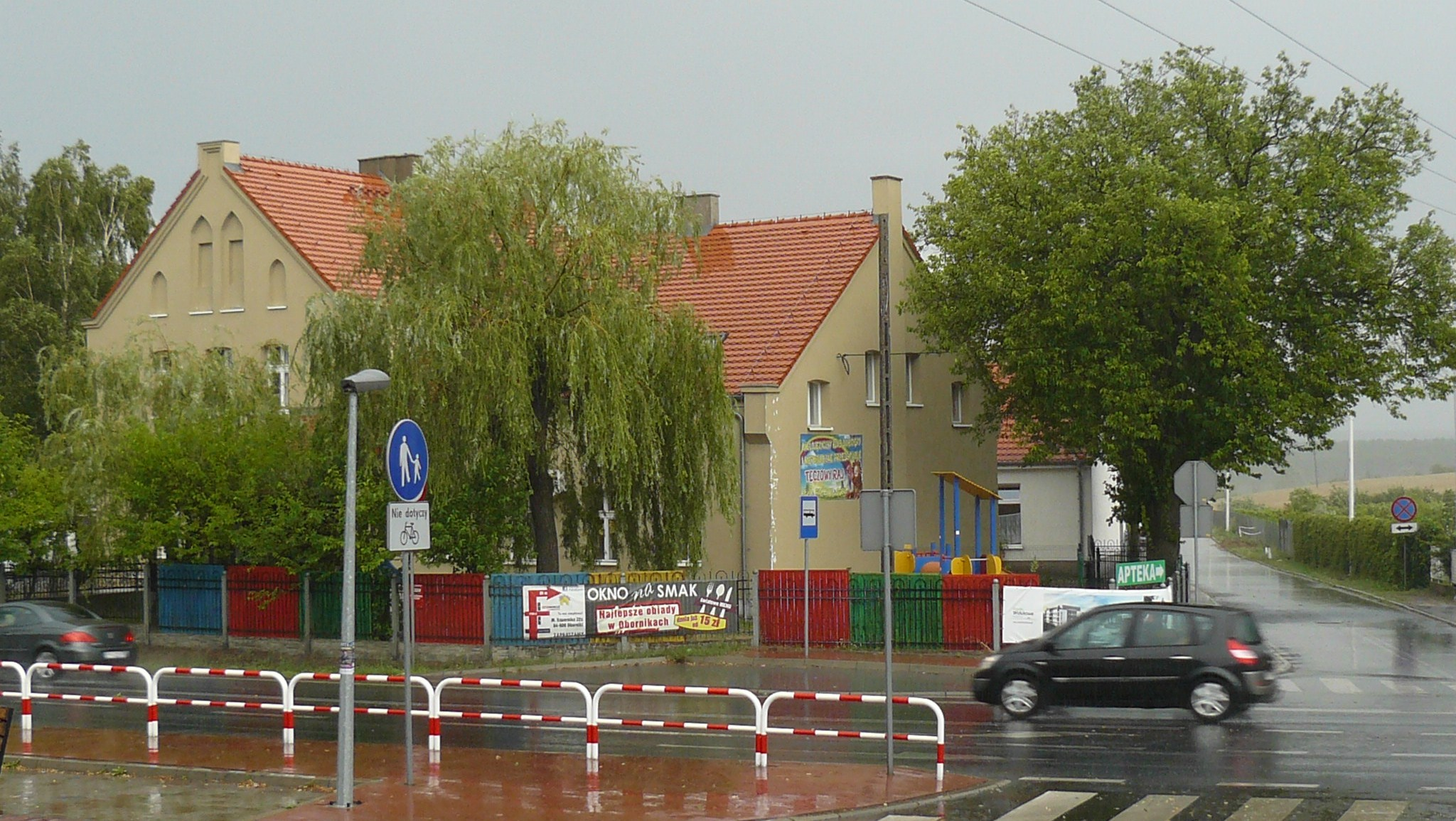
- Old school in Bogdanowo

- Location within Poland
- Coordinates: 52°37′32″N 16°48′8″E
- Country: Poland
- Voivodeship: Greater Poland
- County: Oborniki
- Gmina: Oborniki

Bogdanowo ([bɔɡdaˈnɔvɔ]; German: Bogenau) is a village in the administrative district of Gmina Oborniki, within Oborniki County, Greater Poland Voivodeship, in west-central Poland.
