= Oborniki County =

Oborniki County Powiat obornicki
- County
- Flag Coat of arms

- Location within the voivodeship
- Coordinates (Oborniki): 52°39′N 16°49′E
- Country: Poland
- Voivodeship: Greater Poland
- Seat: Oborniki
- Gminas: Total 3: Gmina Oborniki; Gmina Rogoźno; Gmina Ryczywół

Area
  - Total: 712.65 km^{2} (275.16 sq mi)

Population (2006)
  - Total: 55,976
  - Density: 78.546/km^{2} (203.43/sq mi)
  - Urban: 28,755
  - Rural: 27,221
- Car plates: POB
- Website: powiatobornicki.pl

Oborniki County (Polish: powiat obornicki) is a unit of territorial administration and local government (powiat) in Greater Poland Voivodeship, west-central Poland. It came into being on January 1, 1999, as a result of the Polish local government reforms passed in 1998. Its administrative seat and largest town is Oborniki, which lies 29 kilometres (18 mi) north of the regional capital Poznań. The only other town in the county is Rogoźno, lying 17 km (11 mi) north-east of Oborniki.

The county covers an area of 712.65 square kilometres (275.2 sq mi). As of 2006 its total population is 55,976, out of which the population of Oborniki is 17,850, that of Rogoźno is 10,905, and the rural population is 27,221.

== Neighbouring counties ==
Oborniki County is bordered by Czarnków-Trzcianka County and Chodzież County to the north, Wągrowiec County to the east, Poznań County to the south, and Szamotuły County to the west.

== Administrative divisions ==
The county is subdivided into three gminas (two urban-rural and one rural). These are listed in the following table, in descending order of population.

Gmina	Type	Area (km^{2})	Population (2006)	Seat
Gmina Oborniki	urban-rural	340.2	31,541	Oborniki
Gmina Rogoźno	urban-rural	218.0	17,322	Rogoźno
Gmina Ryczywół	rural	154.5	7,113	Ryczywół
