= Statue of Stanisława Leszczyńska =

Monument in Warsaw, Poland

- Interactive map of Statue of Stanisława Leszczyńska
- Location: 2 Karowa Street, Downtown, Warsaw, Poland
- Coordinates: 52°14′40.46″N 21°01′16.74″E
- Designer: Andrzej Renes
- Type: Statue
- Material: Bronze, stone
- Opening date: 8 May 2026
- Dedicated to: Stanisława Leszczyńska

The statue of Stanisława Leszczyńska (Polish pronunciation: [sta.ɲiˈswa.va lɛʂˈt͡ʂɘ̟ɲ.ska]; Polish: Pomnik Stanisławy Leszczyńskiej) is a monument in Warsaw, Poland, located within the neighbourhood of Powiśle in the Downtown district. It is placed in front of the Duchess Anna of Masovia Clinical Hospital at 2 Karowa Street. The bronze statue is dedicated to Stanisława Leszczyńska, a 20th-century midwife, who while incarcerated at the Auschwitz concentration camp from 1943 to 1945, during Second World War, delivered over 3,000 children. It was designed by Andrzej Renes, and unveiled on 8 May 2026.

== History ==
The monument is dedicated to Stanisława Leszczyńska (1896–1974), a 20th-century midwife, who while incarcerated at the Auschwitz concentration camp from 1943 to 1945, during Second World War, delivered over 3,000 children. While doing so she deified orders from the camp head physician Josef Mengele, to deny care to birthing mothers and kill the newborns, risking her own life. The bronze sculpture was designed by sculptor Andrzej Renes, and unveiled on 8 May 2026, in the 130th anniversary of Leszczyńska's birth, with the date also being celebrated as the Midwife Day in her commemoration. The memorial was placed in front of the Duchess Anna of Masovia Clinical Hospital, which previously housed the Warsaw Municipal School of Midwifery, from which Leszczyńska graduated in 1922.

== Characteristics ==
The monument has a form of a bronze statue, depicting Stanisława Leszczyńska in a midwife gown, holding two newborns in her hands at her chest. Its base has a shape of a triangle, with a letter P in an inverted triangle and number 41335 inscribed on its side. The former symbolises a concentration camp badge which was worn on prison uniforms, with a red inverted triangle with the letter P being assigned to Polish political prisoners. The latter symbolises the inmate identification number assigned in the Auschwitz concentration camp to Leszczyńska, and which was forcibly tattooed on her arm.

To the left of the statue is placed a stone rectangular plinth, stylilised to resemble a broken portion of a chimney flue, placed on its side, reminined of the one used by Leszczyńska as a makeshift midwife table in the Auschwitz concentration camp. On the front side, it bares an inscription in Polish which reads:

Polish inscription

W tym Szpitalu w 1922 roku otrzymała dyplom położnej Stanisława Leszczyńska (8.05.1896 – 11.03.1974)
Podczas II Wojny Światowej jako położna-więżniarka w obozie KL Auschwitz-Birkenau pracowała na sztubie położniczej w latach 1943–1945 aż do jego wyzwolenia.
W barakau obozowym na przewodzie kominiowym przyjmowała w nieludzkich warunkach.
Ryzykując życie sprzeciwiała się rozkazowi lekarza obozowego
Josefa Mangela aby zabijać noworodki.
Stając przed nim mówiła: „Nie, nigdy! Nie wolno zabijać dzieci”

Translation:
English translation

In this Hospital, Stanisława Leszczyńska (8 May 1896 – 11 March 1974) received the degree in midwifery in 1922.
During the Second World War, as prisoner at the Auschwitz-Birkenau concentration camp, she worked as a midwife at the maternity ward between 1943 and 1945 until its emancipation.
In the camp barracks, she received births on chimney flue, she received in inhuman conditions.
Risking her own life, she defied the orders from the camp physisian Josef Mengele, to kill the newborns.
Standing in front of him, she said: "No, never! One shall never kill a child"

On its top, it has an inscribed list of some of the children saved by Stanisława Leszczyńska from being killed by the German camp officers. It begins with Polish sentence "Imiona dzieci ocalonych", which translates to "The names of saved children", and is followed by the list, with the following names: Elżbieta, Nikola, Gienadij, Larisa, Anna, Helena, Tadeusz, Bogdan, Józefa, Zofia, Janina, Jan, Maria, Marla, Olga, Józef, Mikołaj, Tadeusz, Teresa, Krzysztof, Zdzisław, Jerzy, Róża, Henryk, Władimir, Stanisława, Anton, Władimir, Władysław, Jerzy, Władimir, Walentin, Teresa, Józef, Wiktor, Ludmiła, Fiodor, Katia, Ryszard, Jolanta, Luba, Walenty, Elżbieta, Janina, Władysław, Anatol, Maria, Galina, Heinz, Maciej, Teresa, Stefania, Galina, Andrej, Wiktor, Maria, Elżbieta, Anatol, Alexander, Teresa, Regina, Stanisława, Maria, Tamara, Leonid, Alła, Anatolij, Ryszard, Jerzy, Longin, Krystyna, Leokadia, Maria, Ewa, Marek, Valentina, Marek, Józef, Ewa, Leokadia, Zdzisław, and Irena.

Both the statue and the plinth are placed on a short stone pedestal with a square base. It bares a Polish inscription which reads: "Stanisława Leszczyńska; bohaterska położna z Auschwitz", and translates to "Stanisława Leszczyńska; the hero midwife of Auschwitz".
