= Łódź Ghetto =

Second-largest ghetto in German-occupied Europe during World War II

Coordinates: 51°47′35″N 19°27′50″E

Łódź Ghetto Ghetto Litzmannstadt
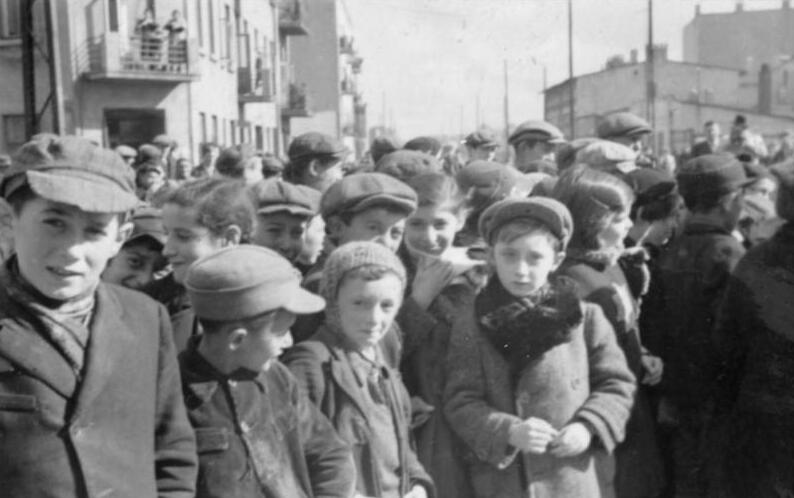
- Jewish children inside the Łódź Ghetto, 1940

- Map of the Łódź Ghetto within the city. The walled-off area is shown in blue in the inset. The Jewish cemetery is at 16; Radegast train station at the top right at 17; Kinder KZ for Polish children is at 15.
- Location: Łódź, German-occupied Poland
- Persecution: Imprisonment, forced labor, starvation
- Organizations: Schutzstaffel (SS); Ordnungspolizei
- Death camp: Chełmno extermination camp Auschwitz-Birkenau
- Victims: 210,000 Polish Jews

The Łódź Ghetto (Polish: Getto łódzkie, Yiddish: לאדזשער געטא, romanized: Ladzsher Geto), or Litzmannstadt Ghetto (after the Nazi German name for Łódź), was a Nazi ghetto established by the German authorities for Polish Jews and Roma following the Invasion of Poland. It was the second-largest ghetto in all of German-occupied Europe after the Warsaw Ghetto. Situated in the city of Łódź, and originally intended as a preliminary step upon a more extensive plan of creating the Judenfrei province of Warthegau, the ghetto was transformed into a major industrial centre, manufacturing war supplies for Nazi Germany and especially for the Wehrmacht. The number of people incarcerated in it was increased further by the Jews deported from Nazi-controlled territories.

On 30 April 1940, when the gates closed on the ghetto, it housed 163,777 residents. Because of its remarkable productivity, the ghetto managed to survive until August 1944. In the first two years, it absorbed almost 20,000 Jews from liquidated ghettos in nearby Polish towns and villages, as well as 20,000 more from the rest of German-occupied Europe. After the wave of deportations to Chełmno extermination camp beginning in early 1942, and in spite of a stark reversal of fortune, the Germans persisted in eradicating the ghetto: they transported the remaining population to Auschwitz and Chełmno extermination camps, where most were murdered upon arrival. It was the last ghetto in occupied Poland to be liquidated. A total of 210,000 Jews passed through it; but only 877 remained hidden when the Soviets arrived. About 10,000 Jewish residents of Łódź, who used to live there before the invasion of Poland, survived the Holocaust elsewhere.

== Establishment ==
When German forces occupied Łódź on 8 September 1939, the city had a population of 672,000 people. Over 230,000 of them were Jewish, or 31.1% according to statistics. Nazi Germany annexed Łódź directly to the new Warthegau region and renamed the city Litzmannstadt in honour of a German general, Karl Litzmann, who had led German forces in the area in 1914. The Nazi German authorities intended to "purify" the city. All Polish Jews were to be expelled to the Generalgouvernement eventually, while the non-Jewish population of Polish people reduced significantly, and transformed into a slave labour force for Germany.

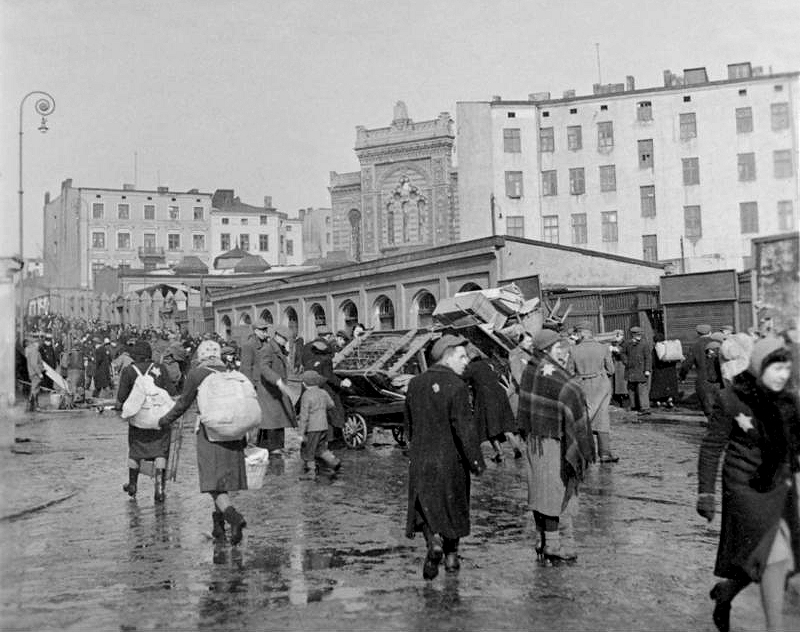
Resettlement of Jews to the ghetto area c. March 1940. Old Synagogue in the far background (no longer extant).

The first known record of an order for the establishment of the ghetto, dated 10 December 1939, came from the new Nazi governor Friedrich Übelhör, who called for the cooperation of major policing bodies in the confinement and mass transfer of the local Jews. By 1 October 1940, the relocation of the ghetto inmates was to have been completed, and the city's downtown core declared Judenrein (cleansed of its Jewish presence). The German occupiers pressed for the ghetto size to be shrunk beyond all sense in order to have their factories registered outside of it. Łódź was a multicultural mosaic before the war began, with about 8.8% ethnic German residents on top of Austrian, Czech, French, Russian and Swiss business families adding to its vibrant economy.

The securing of the ghetto system was preceded by a series of anti-Jewish measures as well as anti-Polish measures meant to inflict terror. The Jews were forced to wear the yellow badge. Their businesses were expropriated by the Gestapo. After the invasion of Poland, many Jews, particularly the intellectual and political elite, had fled the advancing German army into the Soviet-occupied eastern Poland and to the area of future General Government in the hope of the Polish counter-attack which never came. On 8 February 1940, the Germans ordered the Jewish residence to be limited to specific streets in the Old City and the adjacent Bałuty quarter, the areas that would become the ghetto. To expedite the relocation, the Orpo Police launched an assault on 5–7 March 1940, known as "Bloody Thursday", in which 350 Jews were fatally shot in their homes, and outside. Over the next two months, wooden and wire fences were erected around the area to cut it off from the rest of the city. Jews were formally sealed within the ghetto walls on 1 May 1940.

As nearly 25 percent of the Jews had fled the city by the time the ghetto was set up, its prisoner population as of 1 May 1940 was 164,000. Over the coming year, Jews from German-occupied Europe as far away as Luxembourg were deported to the ghetto on their way to the extermination camps. By 1 May 1941, the population of the ghetto was 148,547.

A small Romani population was also resettled there. In early November 1941, approximately 5000 Austrian Romani were transported the Ghetto. However, their stay in the ghetto was short and by January 1942 the group had been taken from Lodz to Chełmno extermination camp where they were all killed using mobile gas vans.

== Ghetto policing ==
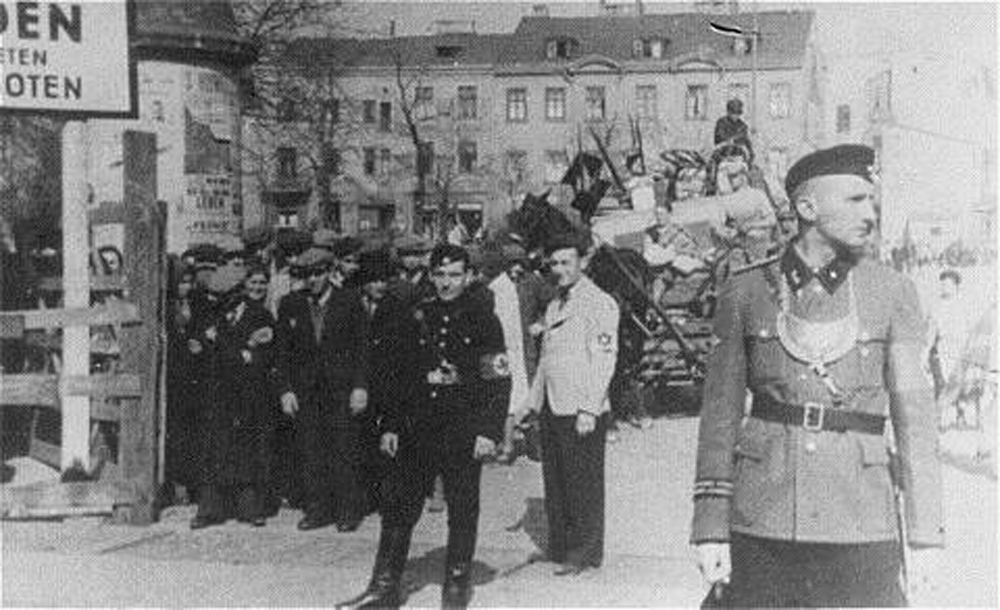
German and Jewish police guard at the entrance to the ghetto

To ensure no contact between the Jewish and non-Jewish populations of the city, two German Order Police battalions were assigned to patrol the perimeter of the ghetto, including the Reserve Police Battalion 101 from Hamburg. Within the ghetto, the Jewish Police force was created to ensure that no prisoners tried to escape. On 10 May 1940 orders went into effect prohibiting any commercial exchange between Jews and non-Jews in Łódź. By the new German decree, those caught outside the ghetto could be shot on sight. The contact with people who lived on the "Aryan" side was also impaired by the fact that Łódż had a 70,000-strong ethnic German minority loyal to the Nazis (the Volksdeutsche), making it impossible to bring food illegally. To keep outsiders out, rumours were also spread by Hitler's propaganda saying that the Jews were the carriers of infectious diseases. For the week of 16–22 June 1941 (the week Nazi Germany launched Operation Barbarossa), the Jews reported 206 deaths and two shootings of women near the barbed wire. On October 20, 1940, the central prison was opened in Czarnieckiego (Schneidergasse) 12–16.

In other ghettos throughout Poland, thriving underground economies based on smuggling of food and manufactured goods developed between the ghettos and the outside world. In Łódź, however, this was practically impossible due to heavy security. The Jews were entirely dependent on the German authorities for food, medicine and other vital supplies. To exacerbate the situation, the only legal currency in the ghetto was a specially created ghetto currency. Faced with starvation, Jews traded their remaining possessions and savings for this scrip, thereby abetting the process by which they were dispossessed of their remaining belongings.

On February 17, 1941, Ghetto Administrator Hans Biebow mandated that butter be delivered in special packaging to prevent black market trading by Polish smugglers. In the same month, demolition began on buildings along the ghetto's borders, including Ogrodowa, Północna, and Zgierska Streets, to create a so-called "sanitary protection zone" against typhus. Jewish labourers carried out the demolition, completed by August 1941. The area later became Old City Park.

Despite the harsh conditions, cultural life persisted. On March 1, 1941, the ghetto's Cultural Center officially opened at 3 Krawiecka Street, though performances had already begun earlier. It hosted concerts, theatre, literary evenings, and art exhibitions with Rumkowski frequently addressing residents there and even officiated mass weddings at its walls.

On March 7, 1941, the first issue of Getto Zeitung, the ghetto's official weekly magazine was published. It included regulations, news, and poetry, and was translated into German for the Criminal Police (Kripo). The paper ran for 18 issues, ending on September 21, 1941, due to a paper shortage. On April 13, 1941, Schutzpolizei commander Colonel Walter Keuck ordered that anyone attempting to enter the ghetto—or even throw objects over the fence—would be shot.

== Food consumption and malnutrition ==
Jews within the Łódź Ghetto had an average daily food energy intake of 4,200–5,000 kilojoules (1,000–1,200 kilocalories), which led directly to starvation and even to death. The process of purchasing food relied heavily on the quantity and quality of the goods that the ghetto citizens brought from their houses into the ghetto. Previous social class and wealth of ghetto inhabitants often determined the fate of food accessibility. While the wealthy could purchase additional food, many of the lower class Jewish inhabitants relied heavily on the ration card system. Food embezzlement by police forces within the ghetto encouraged hierarchy even amongst Jewish neighbors. Food became a means of control for the German forces and by the Jewish policing administration.

Food deprivation often caused strain on family relations but parents, siblings, and spouses would also hold out on their portion of food for the benefit of loved ones. People would trade furniture and clothing to receive food for their family members or themselves. Jewish women invented new ways of cooking in order to make food and supplies last longer. Tuberculosis and other diseases were widespread due to malnutrition. The physical attributes of malnutrition in the Łódź Ghetto led to sunken eyes, swollen abdomens and aged appearances while also stunting the growth of ghetto children.

== Organization ==
Administratively, the Łódź ghetto was subject to the City Council. Initially, mayor of occupied Łódź Karol Marder separated from the provisioning and economy department the branch for the ghetto at Cegielniana street (today Jaracza 11), whose manager was first Johann Moldenhauer, and then a merchant from Bremen, Hans Biebow. From October 1940, the facility was raised to the rank of an independent department of the city council – Gettoverwaltung, reporting to Mayor Werner Ventzki. Initially, the main tasks of the ghetto board were supplying, supplying medicines and settling the ghetto with the city. Soon, however, the inhabitants began to be plundered and exploited to the maximum, transforming the ghetto into a forced labor camp in hunger for food rations and extreme living conditions. From 1942, Hans Biebow and his deputies Józef Haemmerle and Wilhelm Ribbe demonstrated in the selection and displacement of ghetto inhabitants, and Biebow and his commercial capabilities were quickly appreciated by the dignitaries of the central authorities of the Warta Country. Biebow became the real ruler of the ghetto, and Gettoverwaltung officials arrived at a rapid pace – from 24 people in May 1940 to 216 in mid-1942.

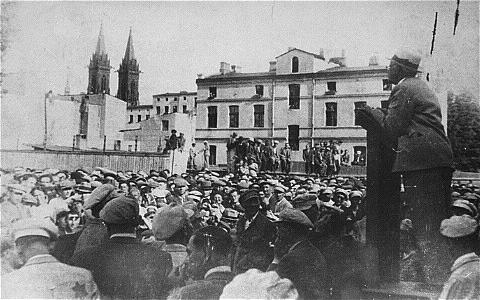
Chaim Rumkowski delivering a speech in the ghetto, 1941–42

To organize the local population and maintain order, the German authorities established a Jewish Council commonly called the Judenrat or the Ältestenrat ("Council of Elders") in Łódź. The chairman of the Judenrat appointed by the Nazi administration was Chaim Rumkowski (age 62 in 1939). Even today, he is still considered one of the most controversial figures in the history of the Holocaust. Known mockingly as "King Chaim", Rumkowski was granted unprecedented powers by the Nazi officials, which authorized him to take all necessary measures to maintain order in the ghetto.

Directly responsible to the Nazi Amtsleiter Hans Biebow, Rumkowski adopted an autocratic style of leadership in order to transform the ghetto into an industrial base manufacturing war supplies. Convinced that Jewish productivity would ensure survival, he forced the population to work 12-hour days despite abysmal conditions and the lack of dietary energy and protein; producing uniforms, garments, wood and metalwork, and electrical equipment for the German military. By 1943, some 95 percent of the adult population was employed in 117 workshops, which – Rumkowski once boasted to the mayor of Łódź – were a "gold mine." It was possibly because of this productivity that the Łódź Ghetto managed to survive long after all the other ghettos in occupied Poland were liquidated. Rumkowski systematically singled out for expulsion his political opponents, or anyone who might have had the capacity to lead a resistance to the Nazis. Conditions were harsh and the population was entirely dependent on the Germans. Typical intake, made available, averaged between 2,900 and 3,800 kilojoules (700 and 900 kilocalories) per day, about half the dietary energy required for survival. People affiliated with Rumkowski received disproportionately larger deliveries of food, medicine, and other rationed necessities. Everywhere else starvation was rampant and diseases like tuberculosis widespread, fueling dissatisfaction with Rumkowski's administration, which led to a series of strikes in the factories. In most instances, Rumkowski relied on the Jewish police to quell the discontented workers, although at least in one instance, the German Order Police was asked to intervene. Strikes usually erupted over the reduction of food rations.

On June 27, 1940, a new currency, Ghetto mark (nicknamed "rumki" or "chaimki") replaced German marks in the ghetto. This currency had no value outside the ghetto. The use of other currency was prohibited. By October 10, 1940, the Nazi regime abandoned plans to treat the ghetto as a temporary measure and instead transformed it into a major forced labour complex. Overseen by the Central Bureau of Labour Departments under Aron Jakubowicz, the number of workshops (known as "departments") steadily increased. From 7,000 workers in 18 factories in 1940, employment rose to over 70,000 across 93 departments by 1943. Ghetto labour supported the Wehrmacht, police, paramilitary units, and private German firms. Residents produced military uniforms, coats, bags, furniture, lampshades, textiles, and straw footwear. Workdays lasted 10–14 hours under brutal conditions, with wages as low as 70 pfennigs a day. On September 21, 1941, a tram line opened in the ghetto thanks to Rumkowski's efforts. It connected Brzezińska Street to the Radogoszcz railway station station and was primarily used to transport fuel, raw materials, and finished goods from the ghetto's labor departments.

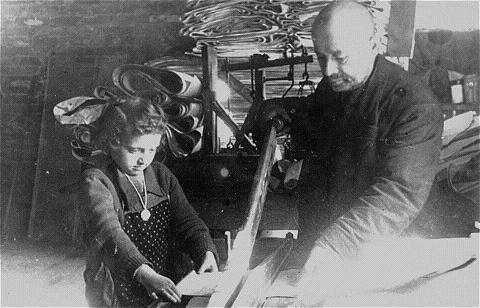
Young girl working in the paper factory

Disease was a major feature of ghetto life with which the Judenrat had to contend. Medical supplies were critically limited, and the ghetto was severely overcrowded. The entire population of 164,000 people was forced into an area of 4 square kilometres (1 1/2 square miles), of which 2.4 square kilometres (7/8 square mile) were developed and habitable. Fuel supplies were severely short, and people burned whatever they could to survive the Polish winter. Some 18,000 people in the ghetto are believed to have died during a famine in 1942, and all together, about 43,800 people died in the ghetto from starvation and infectious disease.

== Deportations ==
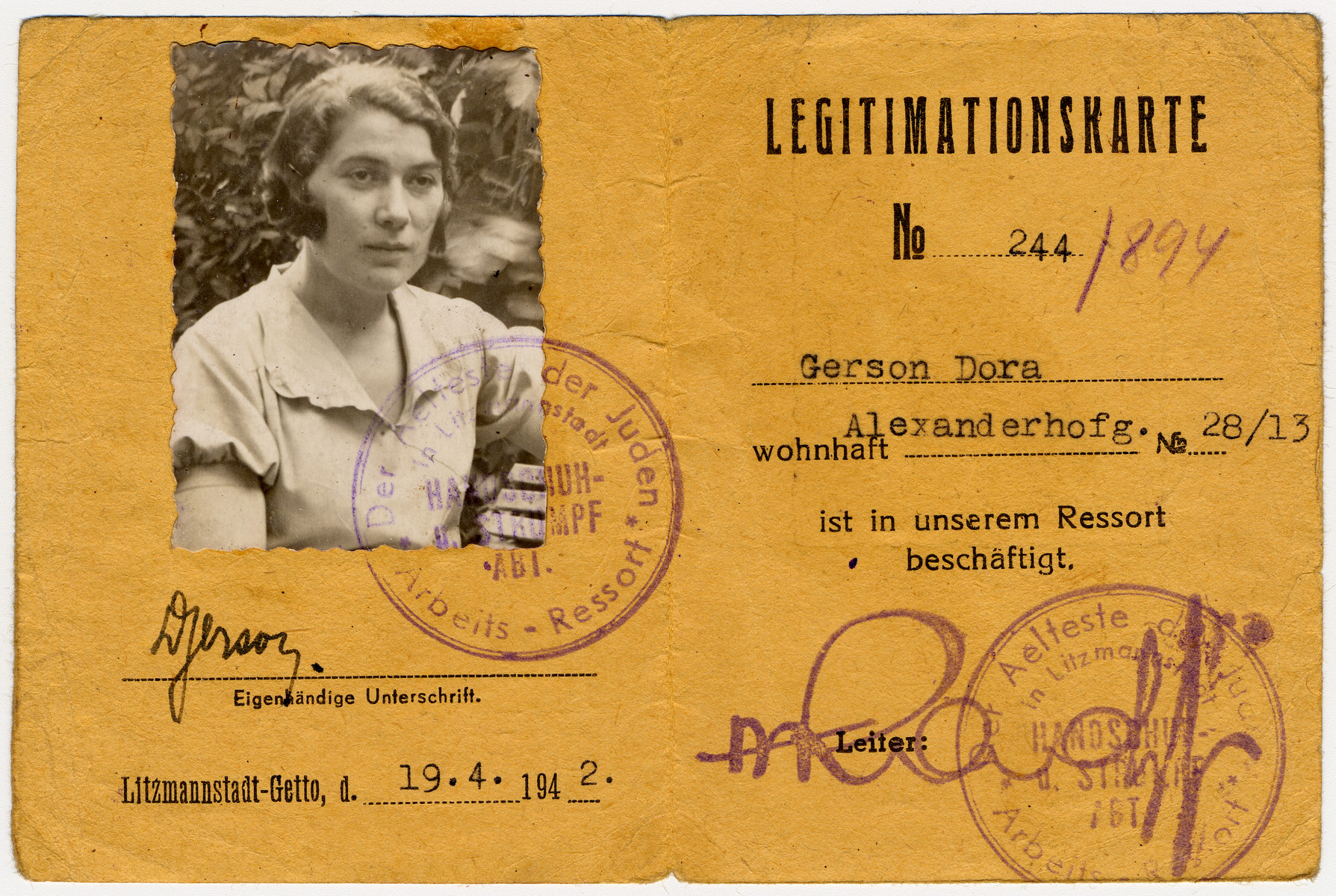
Identity card Lodz Ghetto 19-4-1942

Overcrowding in the ghetto was exacerbated by the influx of some 40,000 Polish Jews forced out from the surrounding Warthegau areas, as well as by the Holocaust transports of foreign Jews resettled to Łódź from Vienna, Berlin, Cologne, Hamburg and other cities in Nazi Germany, as well as from Luxembourg, and the Protectorate of Bohemia and Moravia including the citywide Theresienstadt concentration camp. Heinrich Himmler visited the ghetto for the first time on 7 June 1941. On 29 July 1941, following an inspection, most patients of the ghetto's psychiatric hospital were taken away never to return. "They understood, for example, why they had been injected with tranquilizers in the night. Injections of scopolamine were used, at the request of the Nazi authorities." Situated 50 kilometres (31 mi) north of Łódź in the town of Chełmno, at Kulmhof, gassing operations began on 8 December 1941. Two weeks later, on 20 December 1941, Rumkowski was ordered by the Germans to announce that 20,000 Jews from the ghetto would be deported to undisclosed camps, based on selection by the Judenrat. An Evacuation Committee was set up to help select the initial group of deportees from among those who were labelled 'criminals': people who refused to or who could not work, and people who took advantage of the refugees arriving in the ghetto in order to satisfy their own basic needs.

By the end of January 1942 some 10,000 Jews were deported to Chełmno (known as Kulmhof in German). The Chełmno camp set up by SS-Sturmbannführer Herbert Lange, served as a pilot project for the secretive Operation Reinhard, the deadliest phase of the "Final Solution". In Chełmno, the inmates were murdered with the exhaust fumes of moving gas vans. The stationary gas chambers had yet to be built at Operation Reinhard death camps. By 2 April 1942, an additional 34,000 victims were sent there from the ghetto, with 11,000 more by 15 May 1942, and over 15,000 more by mid September, for an estimated total of 55,000 people. The Germans planned that children, the elderly, and anyone deemed "not fit for work" would follow them.

In September 1942, Rumkowski and the Jews of Łódź had realized the fate of the evacuees, because all baggage, clothing, and identification papers of their fellow inmates, were being returned to the ghetto for "processing". The slave workers began to strongly suspect that deportation meant death; even though they had never deduced that the annihilation of Jews was all-encompassing, as was intended. They witnessed the German raid on a children's hospital where all patients were rounded up and put into trucks never to return (some thrown from windows). A new German order demanded that 24,000 Jews be handed over for deportation. A debate raged in the ghetto over who should be given up. Rumkowski sounded more convinced than ever that the only chance for Jewish survival lay in the ability to work productively for the Reich without interference. As Rumkowski believed productivity was necessary for survival, he thought they should give their 13,000 children and their 11,000 elderly. He addressed the parents of Łódź as follows.

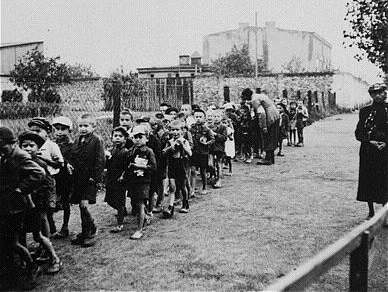
Children rounded up for deportation to Chełmno, September 1942

A grievous blow has struck the ghetto. They [the Germans] are asking us to give up the best we possess – the children and the elderly. I was unworthy of having a child of my own, so I gave the best years of my life to children. I've lived and breathed with children, I never imagined I would be forced to deliver this sacrifice to the altar with my own hands. In my old age, I must stretch out my hands and beg: Brothers and sisters! Hand them over to me! Fathers and mothers: Give me your children! — Chaim Rumkowski, September 4, 1942

Despite their horror, parents had little choice but to turn over their children for deportation. Some families committed collective suicide to avoid the inevitable. The deportations slowed down, for a time, only after the purge of the ghetto was completed. Some 89,446 able-bodied prisoners remained. In October, the number of German troops was reduced, as no longer needed. The German Reserve Police Battalion 101 left the ghetto to conduct anti-Jewish operations in Polish towns with direct lines to Treblinka, Bełżec, and Sobibór. Meanwhile, a rare camp for the Christian children between 8 and 14 years of age was set up adjacent to the ghetto in December 1942, separated only by a high fence made of planks. Some 12,000–13,000 adolescent Poles with parents already dead went through the Kinder-KZ Litzmannstadt according to International Tracing Service. Subjected to a selection process for Germanisation, the 1,600 children performed work closely connected with the industrial output of the ghetto, with help and advice from Jewish instructors.

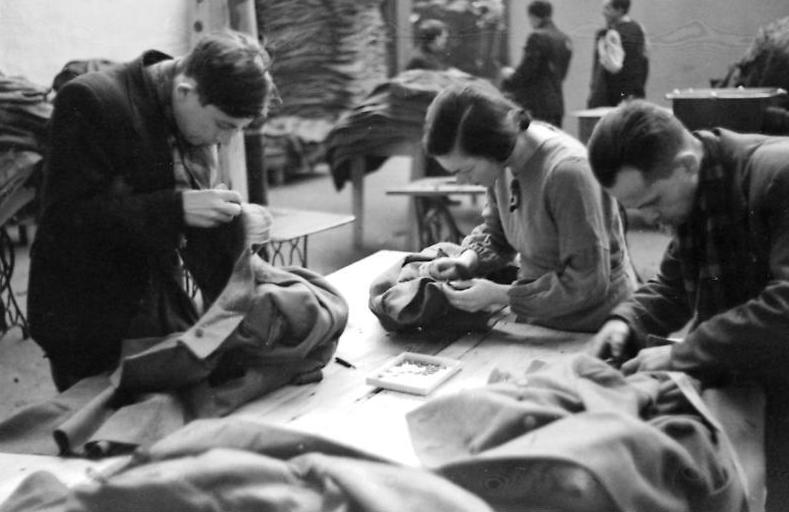
Jews clean and repair coats salvaged at Chełmno for redistribution among Volksdeutsche in accordance with the top secret August Frank memorandum. The yellow badge was removed.

Since late 1942 the production of war supplies was coordinated by the autonomous German Management Board (Gettoverwaltung). The ghetto was transformed into a giant labor camp where survival depended solely on the ability to work. Two small hospitals were set up in 1943, nonetheless hundreds of tormented prisoners died each month. In April 1,000 Jews were transferred to labour camps in Germany. In September 1943 Himmler ordered Greiser to get ready for a mass relocation of labour to the Nazi District of Lublin. Max Horn from the Ostindustrie arrived and made an assessment, which was damning. The ghetto was too large in his opinion, badly managed, not profitable, and it had the wrong products. From his perspective the presence of children was unacceptable. The relocation idea was abandoned, but the immediate consequence of his report was an order to reduce the size of the ghetto. By January 1944, there were around 80,000 Jewish workers still subsisting in Łódź. In February, Himmler brought back Bothmann to reinstate operations at Chełmno.

== Camp for Polish children ==
On 28 November 1942, a camp for Polish children was opened. The official name of the camp was "Security Police Litzmannstadt Isolation Camp for Polish Youth" (German: Polen-Jugendverwahrlager der Sicherheitspolizei in Litzmannstadt); however, the camp was referred to as the Camp on Przemyslowa Street. The camp housed children aged 8–16 who were orphans or accused of criminal activity such as theft. More than 1,000 children lived there, separated from their parents, working eight hours a day. They were fed starvation rations and had no access to water, heating or bathrooms. They were subjected to torture and beaten by the guards. The camp operated until the Lodz ghetto was liquidated.

== Liquidation ==
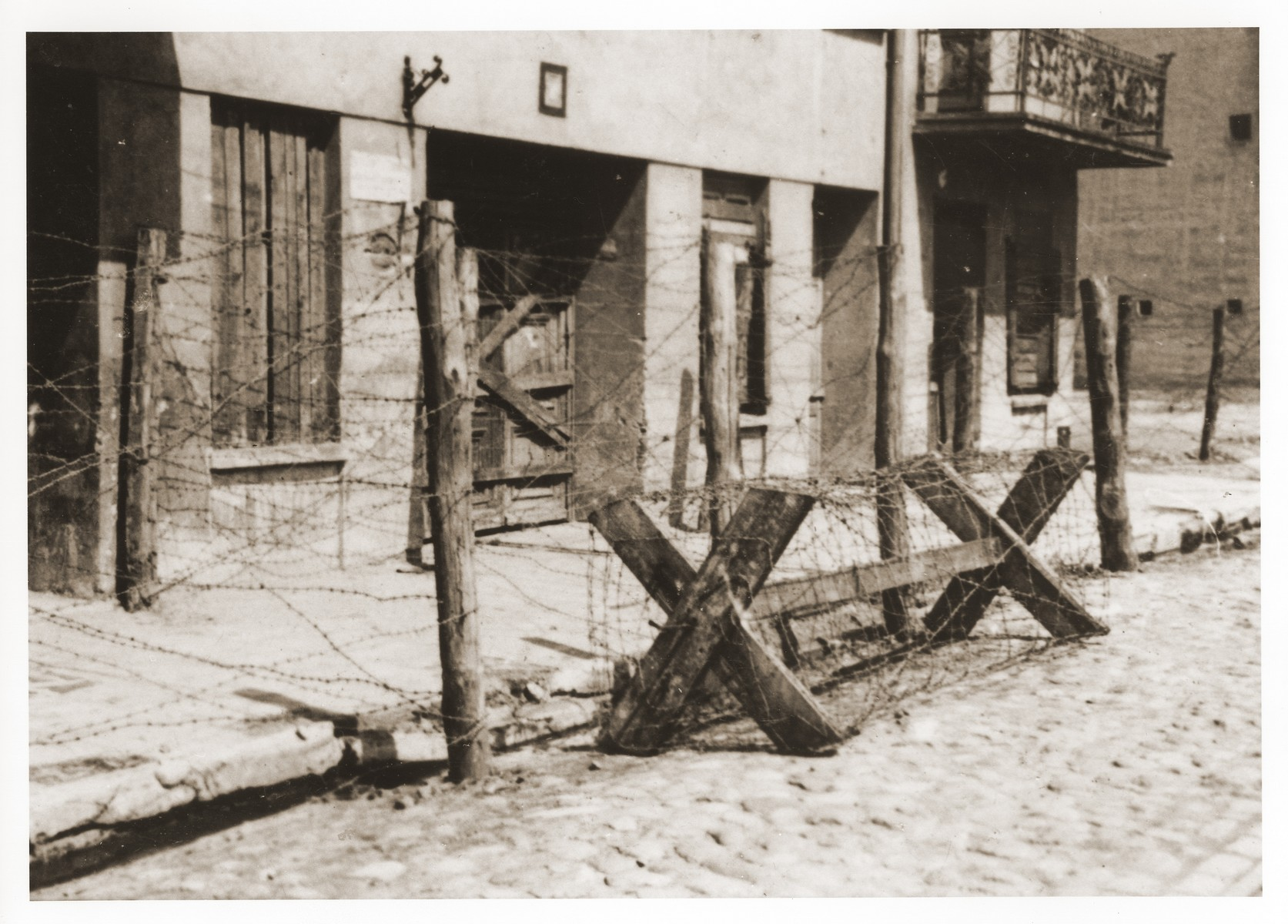
The Gypsy quarter in the ghetto after its inhabitants had been transported to the Chełmno extermination camp

In early 1944, the ultimate fate of the Łódź Ghetto was debated among the highest-ranking Nazis. The initial wave of deportations to Chełmno ended in the autumn of 1942; over 72,000 people defined as "dispensable" were murdered. Heinrich Himmler called for the final liquidation of the ghetto. Between 23 June and 14 July 1944, the first 10 transports of about 7,000 Jews were sent by Arthur Greiser from the Radegast train station to Chełmno. Although the killing centre was partly razed in April 1943, it had resumed gassing operations specifically for this purpose. Meanwhile, Armaments Minister Albert Speer proposed the ghetto be continued as a source of cheap labour for the front.

On 15 July 1944 the transports paused for two weeks. On 1 August 1944 the Warsaw Uprising erupted, and the fate of the remaining inhabitants of the Łódź Ghetto was sealed. During the last phase of its existence, some 25,000 inmates were murdered at Chełmno, their bodies burned immediately after death. As the front approached, German officials decided to deport the remaining Jews to Auschwitz-Birkenau aboard Holocaust trains, including Rumkowski. On 28 August 1944, Rumkowski's family were gassed along with thousands of others.

On 17 August 1944, The Gestapo announced the exclusion of the following streets from the ghetto: Wolborska, Nad Łódką, Zgierska, Dolna, Łagiewnicka, Brzezińska, Smugowa and the Old Market Square, Kościelny Square and Bałucki Rynek. The presence of Jews in these areas was punishable by death.

A handful of people were left alive in the ghetto to clean it up. Others remained in hiding with the Polish rescuers. When the Soviet army entered Łódź on 19 January 1945, only 877 Jews were still alive, 12 of whom were children. Of the 223,000 Jews in Łódź before the invasion, only 10,000 survived the Holocaust in other places.

=== Forms of resistance ===
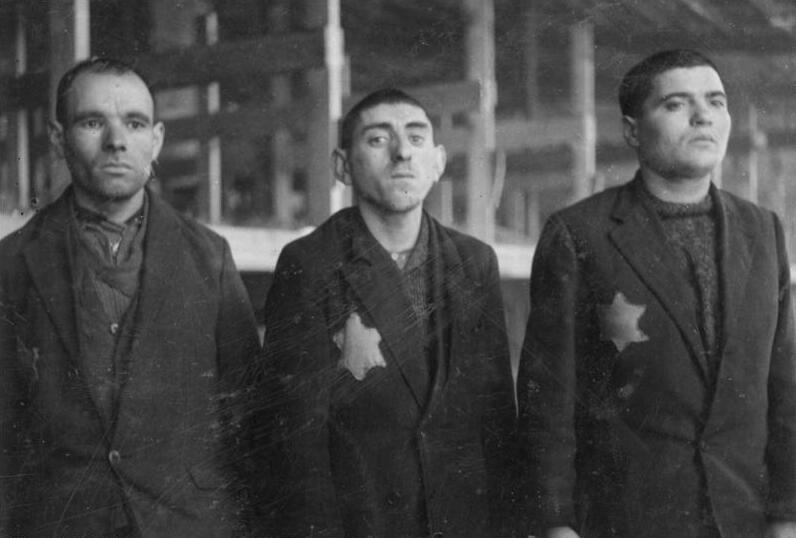
Jewish prisoners of the Gestapo KZ Radogoszcz in Łódź, 1940

The peculiar situation of the Łódź Ghetto prevented armed resistance, which occurred within other ghettos in Nazi-occupied Poland, such as the Warsaw Ghetto Uprising, the Białystok Ghetto Uprising, the revolt at the Wilno Ghetto, the Częstochowa Ghetto Uprising, or similar rebellions in other Polish cities. Rumkowski's overbearing autocracy including his periodic crackdowns, and the resulting failure of Jewish attempts to smuggle food – and consequently, arms – into the ghetto, as well as misleading confidence that productivity would ensure survival, precluded attempts at an armed revolt.

The distinct forms of defiance included instead the symbolic, polemic and defensive resistance. (Note: Swiss sociologist, Werner Rings, identifies four distinct forms of ghetto resistance: symbolic, polemic, and defensive; with offensive resistance (including sabotage) constituting its final form.) Throughout the early period, the symbolic resistance was evident in the rich cultural and religious life that the people maintained in the ghetto. Initially, they created 47 schools and daycare facilities which continued to operate despite harsh conditions. Later, when the school buildings were converted to new living quarters for some 20,000 inmates brought in from outside occupied Poland, alternatives were established, particularly for younger children whose mothers were forced to work. Schools tried to provide children with adequate nourishment despite meager rations. After the schools were shut down in 1941, many of the factories continued to maintain illegal daycare centres for children whose mothers were working.

Political organizations also continued to exist, and engaged in strikes when rations were cut. In one such instance, a strike got so violent that the German Orpo police were called upon to suppress it. At the same time, the rich cultural life included active theatres, concerts, and banned religious gatherings, all of which countered official attempts at dehumanization. Much information about the Jewish day-to-day life in that period can be found in the ghetto archive of Lucjan Dobroszycki from YIVO.

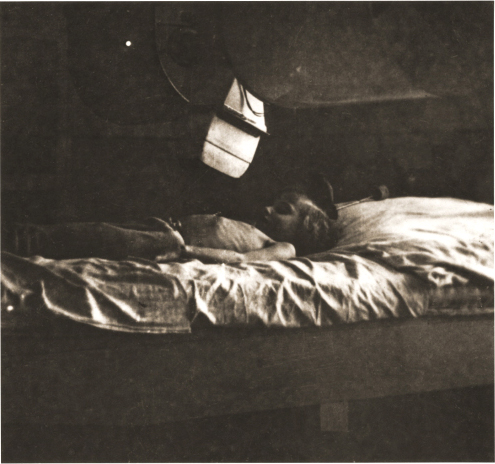
Photographs such as this served to record the horrors of ghetto life for posterity.

The photographers of the statistical department of the Judenrat, besides their official work, illegally took photos of everyday scenes and atrocities. One of them, Henryk Ross, managed to bury the negatives and dig them up after liberation, at 12 Jagielonska Street. Because of this archive, the reality of the ghetto was recorded and preserved. The archivists also began creating a ghetto encyclopedia and a lexicon of the local slang that emerged in their daily lives. The Jewish population maintained several illegal radios with which they kept abreast of events in the outside world. At first, the radio could only receive German broadcast, which is why it was codenamed the "Liar" in the diaries. Among the news that quickly spread around the ghetto was the Allied invasion of Normandy on the day it occurred.

Since production was essential to the German war effort, the slowing down of work was also a form of resistance. In the later years, leftist workers adopted the slogan P.P. (pracuj powoli, or "work slowly") to hinder their own output on behalf of the Wehrmacht.

== Escape and rescue efforts ==
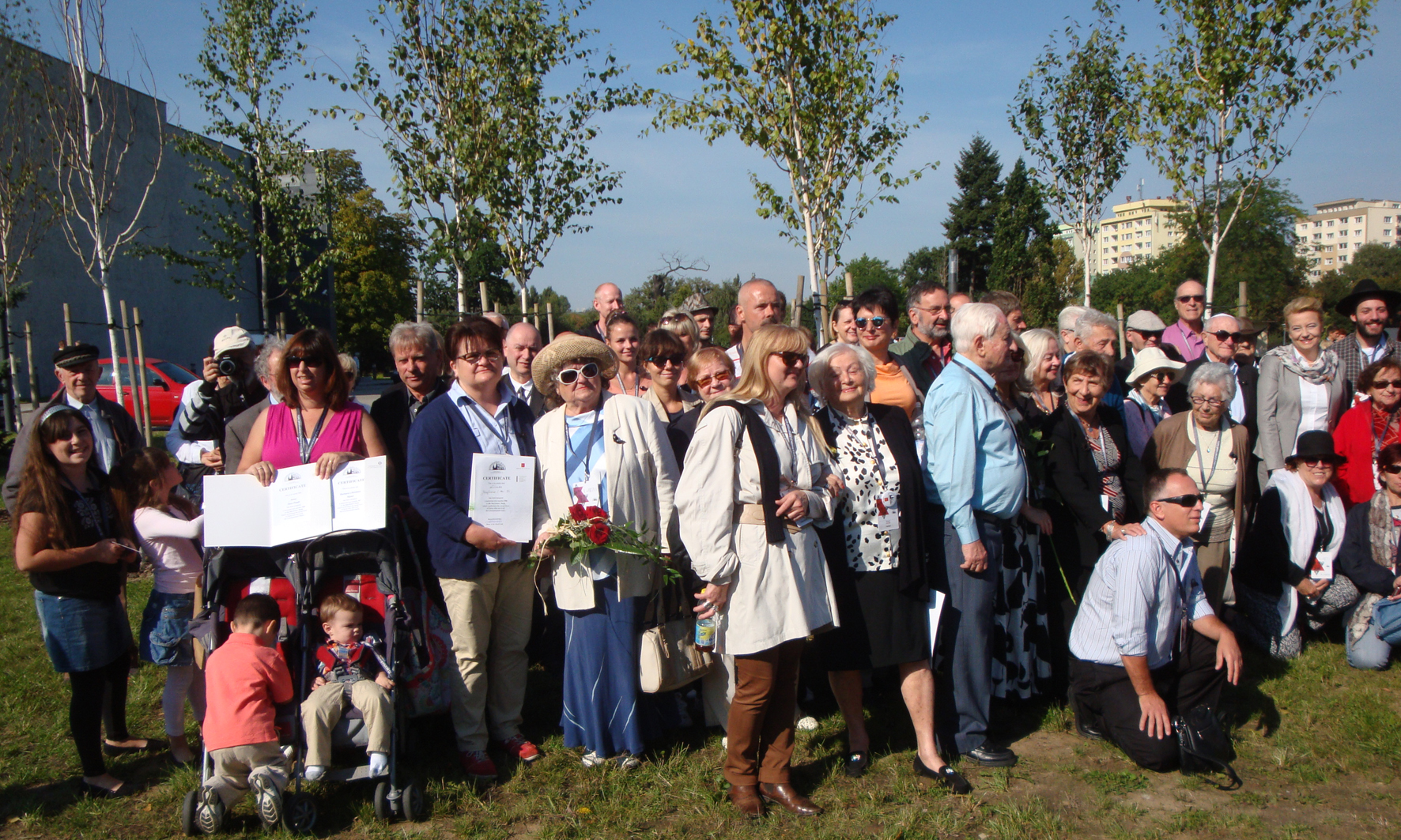
The Polish rescuers and the Jewish survivors plant Trees of Memory during the ceremony at the Park of the Rescued Park Ocalałych w Łodzi inaugurated in Łódź in August 2009.

A number of Poles from Łódź were awarded titles of Righteous among the Nations by Yad Vashem in Jerusalem. On their and their families initiative, a Survivors' Park adorned with monuments was built in Łódź, measuring 3,660 square metres (39,400 sq ft). It was inaugurated in August 2009 by the President of Poland Lech Kaczyński in the presence of prominent dignitaries. A year later, the Park was awarded a medal for top urban design by the Towarzystwo Urbanistów Polskich.

One of the Poles who helped the Jews in Łódź was a Catholic midwife Stanisława Leszczyńska. She and her family provided food, clothing and fake documents to many Jewish fugitives. Eventually, however, she and her family were arrested by the Germans. She and her daughter were deported to Auschwitz. Later on she became known for her effort to save many Jewish children; her sons were sent to stone quarries of Mauthausen.

== Notable inmates ==
- Lucjan Dobroszycki (1919–1995), scientist and historian
- Melania Fogelbaum (1911–1944), poet and painter
- Mendel Grossman (1913–1945), photographer, died during the Death Marches
- Georg John (1879–1941), actor from films such as M and The Last Laugh, died November 1941
- Heda Margolius Kovály (1919–2010), author of autobiography Under a Cruel Star
- Yisrael Kristal (1903–2017), the world's oldest living man in 2016–2017 and among the ten oldest verified men ever
- Rywka Lipszyc (1929–1945?), teenage diarist, wrote The Diary of Rywka Lipszyc, survived the Holocaust but may have died during or after September 1945
- Rudolf Margolius (1913–1952), victim of the Slánský trial
- Chava Rosenfarb (1923–2011), writer
- Oskar Rosenfeld (1884–1944), writer, ghetto chronicler, killed at Auschwitz
- Henryk Ross (1910–1991), photographer who documented conditions in the camp
- Mordechai Chaim Rumkowski (1877–1944), Judenälteste ("Elder of the Jews"), head of the Judenrat, killed at Auschwitz
- Ruth Minsky Sender (1926–2024), author (The Cage, set partly in the ghetto)
- Dawid Sierakowiak (1924-1943), teenage diarist, wrote The Diary of Dawid Sierakowiak: Five Notebooks from the Lodz Ghetto; died of tuberculosis and starvation in the ghetto
- Jakob Edmund Speyer (1872–1942), medicinal chemist, co-inventor of oxycodone (Eukodal), died on 5 May 1942
- Isaiah Spiegel (Hebrew: ישעיהו שפיגל, Polish: Jeszajahu Szpigel) (January 14, 1906 – July 14, 1990), Polish and Israeli poet, writer and essayist writing in Yiddish. He wrote a number of short stories and an autobiographical novel about Łódź Ghetto
- Salomon Szapiro (aka Dr. Szeffer, 1882–1941), medical doctor and chess master, died in the ghetto 18 November 1941
- Jack Tramiel (1928–2012), founder of Commodore International, owner of Atari
- Maurycy Trębacz (1861–1941), painter, died of hunger in the ghetto on 29 January 1941

== See also ==
- Jewish ghettos in German-occupied Poland
- Kinder KZ, German concentration camp for Polish children inside the Łódź Ghetto.
- The Story of Chaim Rumkowski and the Jews of Lodz, a 1982 documentary; runtime: 55 min.

== Sources ==
- Dobroszycki, Lucjan, ed. (1987) [1984]. The Chronicle of the Łódź Ghetto, 1941–1944. Translated by Richard Lourie; Joachim Neugroschel; et al. Yale University Press. Abridged edition, Hardcover. ISBN 978-0-300-03924-5 – via Google Books. ISBN 0-300-03208-0; Paperback, 1987.
- Horwitz, Gordon J. (2009). Ghettostadt: Łódź and the making of a Nazi city. Cambridge, Massachusetts: Harvard University Press. pp. 27, 54–55, 62. ISBN 978-0-674-03879-0 – via Google Books, preview.
- Trunk, Isaiah; Shapiro, Robert Moses (2008) [2006]. Łódź Ghetto: A History. Bloomington, Ind.: Indiana University Press. ISBN 978-0-253-34755-8 – via Google Books, preview.
- Online Exhibit: Give Me Your Children: Voices from the Łódź Ghetto (Internet Archive), United States Holocaust Memorial Museum.
- Library Bibliography: Łódź Ghetto, United States Holocaust Memorial Museum
- Archiwum Państwowe w Łodzi (Polish State Archive in Lodz) Ghetto collection
- "Haunting Voices From Łódź Ghetto", Never Again! online Holocaust memorial.
- David Graham (17 March 2002), Full text of Rumkowski's "Give Me Your Children" speech with index and commentary by David Graham. Retrieved 28 July 2015.
- Dr. B. Lee Hobbs, American university students discuss the implications of the Holocaust. From Diary of Łódź Ghetto inmate Dawid Sierakowiak. ISBN 0-19-512285-2.
- Aerial photos of the ghetto from May 1942 (rotated so that north is to the right): 1, 2. For orientation, note the Jewish Cemetery bottom right on second photo, which formed the easternmost portion of the ghetto.
- "I Completely Forgot that I Was Hungry," Youth Groups in the Łódź Ghetto, online exhibition by Yad Vashem.
- Yad Vashem (2015), Łódź Ghetto, Yad Vashem website. Overview. Selected photographs. Retrieved 28 July 2015.
- Simon Says Project, a memoir of Holocaust survivor Simon Lewenberg 2012, homepage.
- Colour slides from the German ghetto administration in Łódź in the Jewish Museum Frankfurt
- The Łódź Ghetto Photographs of Henryk Ross at the Art Gallery of Ontario. LodzGhetto.ago.net collection of Holocaust photographs, interactive.
