= Chaim Rumkowski =

Head of Judenrat in Lodz Ghetto

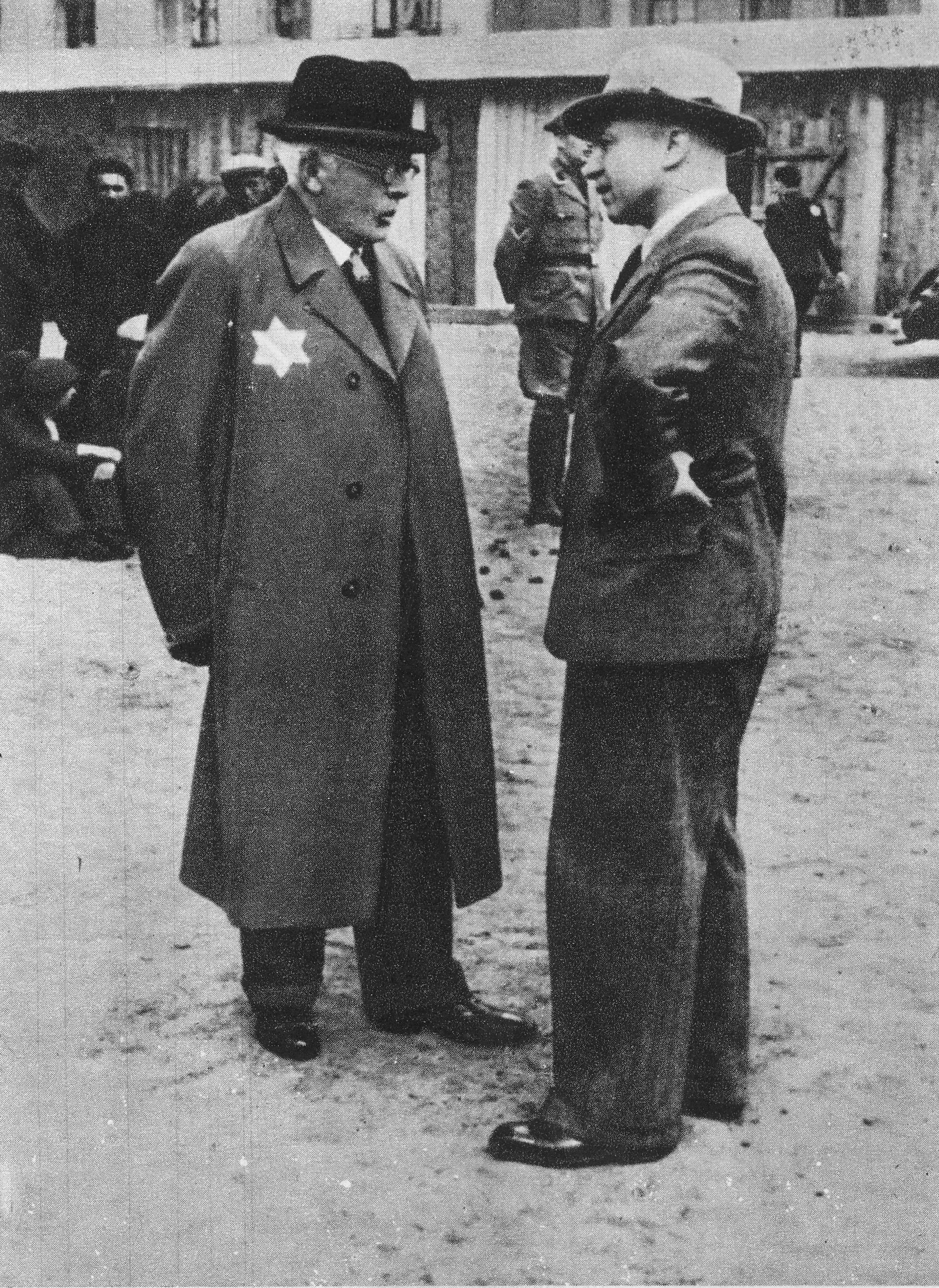
- Chaim Rumkowski (left) and Hans Biebow (right) in the Łódź Ghetto, c. 1940–1944
- Born: February 27, 1877; Ilyino, Velikoluksky District, Russian Empire
- Died: August 28, 1944 (aged 67); Auschwitz-Birkenau, German-occupied Poland
- Cause of death: Lynching
- Known for: Head of Judenrat, Łódź Ghetto

Chaim Mordechaj Rumkowski (February 27, 1877 – August 28, 1944) was the head of the Jewish Council of Elders in the Łódź Ghetto appointed by Nazi Germany during the German occupation of Poland.

Rumkowski accrued much power by transforming the ghetto into an industrial base manufacturing war supplies for the Wehrmacht in the mistaken belief that productivity was the key to Jewish survival beyond the Holocaust. The Germans liquidated the ghetto in 1944. All remaining prisoners were sent to death camps in the wake of military defeats on the Eastern Front.

As the head of the Judenrat, Rumkowski is remembered for his speech Give Me Your Children, delivered at a time when the Germans demanded his compliance with the deportation of 20,000 children to Chełmno extermination camp. In August 1944, Rumkowski and his family joined the last transport to Auschwitz, and he was murdered there on August 28, 1944, by Jewish Sonderkommando inmates who beat him to death as revenge for his role in the Holocaust. This account of his final moments is confirmed by witness testimonies of the Frankfurt Auschwitz trials.

== Background ==
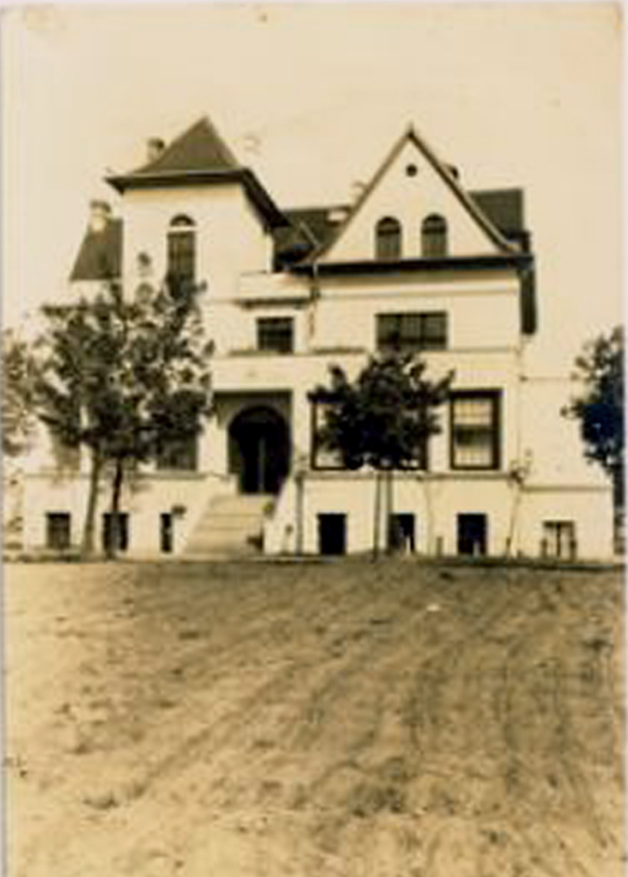
Before the war, Rumkowski directed a Jewish orphanage in Łódź.

Chaim Rumkowski was born on February 27, 1877, to Jewish parents in Ilyino, a shtetl in Vitebsk Governorate, Russian Empire. In 1892, Rumkowski moved to Congress Poland. He became a Polish citizen after the establishment of the Second Polish Republic in 1918. Rumkowski became an activist of the Zionist movement and was involved in the Łódź Zionist Committee.

Before the German invasion of Poland, Rumkowski was an insurance agent in Łódź, a member of Qahal, and the head of a Jewish orphanage at 15 Krajowa Street between 1925 and 1939. According to Dr Edward Reicher, a Holocaust survivor from Łódź, Rumkowski had an unhealthy interest in children. Łódź was annexed by the invading Germans into Nazi Germany and became part of the territory of new Reichsgau Wartheland, separate from the Generalgouvernement established in most of the German-occupied Poland. Smaller Jewish communities were dissolved and forcibly relocated to metropolitan ghettos. The occupation authority ordered the creation of the new Jewish Councils known as the Judenräte which acted as bridges between the Nazis and the prisoner population of the ghettos. In addition to managing basic services such as communal kitchens, infirmaries, post offices and vocational schools, common tasks of the Judenräte included providing the Nazi regime with slave labor, and rounding up quotas of Jews for "resettlement in the East," a euphemism for deportations to extermination camps in the deadliest phase of the Holocaust.

On October 13, 1939, the Nazi Amtsleiter in Łódź appointed Rumkowski the Judenältester ('Chief Elder of the Jews'), head of the Ältestenrat ('Council of Elders'). In this position, Rumkowski reported directly to the Nazi ghetto administration, headed by Hans Biebow. When the rabbinate was dissolved, Rumkowski performed weddings. The ghetto's money or scrip, the so-called Rumki (sometimes Chaimki), was derived from his name, as it had been his idea. His face was put on the ghetto postage stamps and currency, which led to his sarcastic nickname "King Chaim".

By industrializing the Łódź Ghetto, he hoped to make the community indispensable to the Germans and save the people of Łódź. On April 5, 1940, Rumkowski petitioned the Germans for materials for the Jews in exchange for desperately needed food and money. By the end of the month, the Germans had acquiesced, in part, agreeing to provide food, but not money. Although Rumkowski and other "Jewish elders" of the Nazi era came to be regarded as collaborators and traitors, historians have reassessed this judgment since the late 20th century in light of the terrible conditions of the time. A survivor of the Łódź ghetto, Arnold Mostowicz, noted in his memoir that Rumkowski gave a percentage of his people a chance to survive two years longer than the Jews of the Warsaw Ghetto, destroyed in the Uprising. However, as noted by Lucjan Dobroszycki, the ultimate decision on the future was not his to make.

=== Ghetto history prior to the "Final Solution" ===
The ghettoization of Łódź was decided on September 8, 1939, by an order of SS-Oberführer Friedrich Uebelhoer. His top secret document stated that the ghetto was only a temporary solution to "the Jewish question" in the city of Łódź. Uebelhoer never implied the long-term survival of its inhabitants. The ghetto was sealed on April 30, 1940, with 164,000 people inside. On October 16, 1939, Rumkowski selected 31 public figures to form the council. However, less than three weeks later, on November 11, twenty of them were executed and the rest disappeared, because he denounced them to the German authorities "for refusing to rubber-stamp his policies". Although a new Judenrat was officially appointed a few weeks later, the men were not as distinguished, and remained far less effective than its original leaders. This change conceded more power to Rumkowski, and left no one to contest or restrain his decisions. Rumkowski had the Jewish Ghetto Police under his control also.

The Germans authorized Rumkowski as the "sole figure of authority in managing and organizing internal life in the ghetto". Rumkowski gained power by his domineering personality as much as by his words and deeds. Biebow from the first gave Rumkowski full power in organizing the ghetto, as long as it did not interfere with his main objectives: absolute order, confiscation of Jewish property and assets, coerced labor, and Biebow's own personal gain. Their relationship seemed to work effectively. Rumkowski had leeway to organize the ghetto according to his own lights, while Biebow sat back and reaped the rewards. In trying to keep Biebow happy, Rumkowski obeyed every order with little question, and provided him with gifts and personal favors. Rumkowski is said to have boasted of his willingness to cooperate with the German authorities: "My motto is to be always at least ten minutes ahead of every German demand." He believed that by staying ahead of the Germans' thinking, he could keep them satisfied and preserve the Jews. Łódź was the last ghetto in Central Europe to be liquidated. However, only 877 inhabitants survived in the city until liberation, by hiding with Polish rescuers, and it is claimed that Rumkowski had nothing to do with it.

=== Administration ===
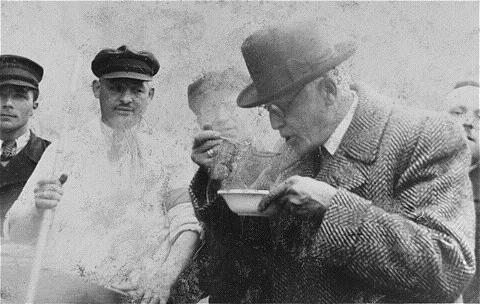
Chaim Rumkowski in the Łódź Ghetto, tasting soup.

Because of the confiscation of cash and other belongings, Rumkowski proposed a currency to be used specifically in the ghetto – the ersatz. This new currency would be used as money, and by this alone, a person could buy food rations and other necessities. This proposal was considered arrogant and illustrated Rumkowski's lust for power. The currency was, therefore, nicknamed by ghetto inhabitants as the "Rumkin". It dissuaded smugglers from endangering their lives to get in and out of the ghetto with goods, as people could not pay for them with regular currency. Rumkowski believed that smuggling of food would "destabilize the ghetto with regard to the prices of basic commodities" and prevented it from taking place.

Rumkowski did not allow public protests expressing dissent. With the help of the Jewish Ghetto Police, he violently broke up demonstrations. On occasion, he would request the Nazis to come and break up the commotion, which usually resulted in protesters being killed. The leaders of these groups were punished by not being allowed to earn a living, which in effect meant that they and their families were doomed to starvation. Sometimes the strikers and demonstrators were arrested, imprisoned, or shipped off to labor camps. By the spring of 1941, almost all opposition to Rumkowski had dissipated. In the beginning, the Germans were unclear of their own plans for the ghetto, as arrangements for the "Final Solution" were still being developed. They realized that the original plan of liquidating the ghetto by October 1940 could not take place, so they began to take Rumkowski's labor agenda seriously. Forced labor became a staple of ghetto life, with Rumkowski running the effort. "In another three years – he said – the ghetto will be working like a clock." This sort of "optimism" however, was met with a damning assessment by Max Horn from Ostindustrie, who said that the ghetto was badly managed, not profitable, and had the wrong products.

== Deportations ==
In January 1942, some 10,000 Jews were sent aboard Holocaust trains to Chełmno based on selections made by the Judenrat. An additional 34,000 victims were sent to Chelmno by 2 April, with 11,000 more in May, and over 15,000 in September 1942, for a total of 71,000 for 1942 as a whole. The children and the elderly as well as anyone deemed "unfit for work" in the eyes of the Judenrat would follow them.

Rumkowski actively cooperated with German demands, hoping to save the majority of the ghetto inmates. Such behaviour set him at odds with the Orthodox observant Jews, because there could be no justification for delivering anyone to certain death. Following the creation of the extermination camp at Chełmno in 1941, the Nazis ordered Rumkowski to organize several waves of deportations. Rumkowski claimed that he tried to convince the Germans to reduce the number of Jews required for deportation and failed.

=== Give Me Your Children ===
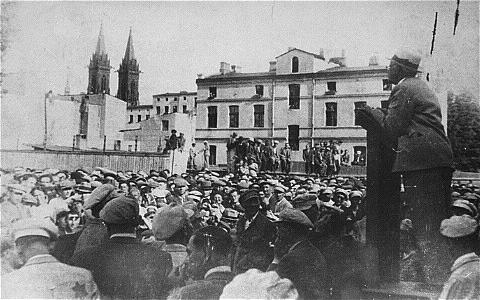
Chaim Rumkowski delivering a speech in the ghetto, 1941–42

On German orders Rumkowski delivered a speech on September 4, 1942, pleading with the Jews in the ghetto to give up children 10 years of age and younger, as well as the elderly over 65, so that others might survive. "Horrible, terrifying wailing among the assembled crowd" could be heard, reads the transcriber's note to his parlance often referred to as: "Give Me Your Children". Some commentators see this speech as exemplifying aspects of the Holocaust.

A grievous blow has struck the ghetto. They [the Germans] are asking us to give up the best we possess – the children and the elderly. I was unworthy of having a child of my own, so I gave the best years of my life to children. I've lived and breathed with children. I never imagined I would be forced to deliver this sacrifice to the altar with my own hands. In my old age, I must stretch out my hands and beg: Brothers and sisters! Hand them over to me! Fathers and mothers: Give me your children!

— Chaim Rumkowski, September 4, 1942

== Personality ==
Rumkowski was ruthless, using his position as head of the Judenrat to confiscate property and businesses that were still being run by their rightful Jewish owners in the ghetto. He established numerous departments and institutions that dealt with all of the ghetto's internal affairs, from housing tens of thousands of people, to distributing food rations. Welfare and health systems were also set up. For a time, his administration maintained seven hospitals, seven pharmacies, and five clinics employing hundreds of doctors and nurses. Despite their effort, many people could not be helped due to the shortage of medical supplies allowed in by the Germans.

Rumkowski helped maintain school facilities. 47 schools remained in operation schooling 63% of school-age children. There was no education in any other ghetto as advanced as in Łódź. He helped set up a "Culture House" where cultural gatherings including plays, orchestra and other performances could take place. He was very involved in the particulars of these events, including hiring and firing performers and editing the content of the shows. He became integrated in religious life. This integration deeply bothered the religious public. For example, since the Germans disbanded the rabbinate in September 1942, Rumkowski began conducting wedding ceremonies, and altering the marriage contract (ketubah). "He treated the ghetto Jews like personal belongings. He spoke to them arrogantly and rudely and sometime beat them".

Due to Rumkowski's harsh treatment, and stern, arrogant personality, the Jews began to blame him for their predicament, and unleashed their frustration on him instead of the Germans, who were beyond their reach. The most significant display of this frustration and resistance was a series of strikes and demonstrations between August 1940 and spring of 1941. Led by activists and leftist parties against Rumkowski, the workers abandoned their stations and went to the streets handing out fliers:

Brothers and sisters! Turn out en masse to wipe out at long last, with joint and unified force, the terrible poverty and the barbaric behaviour of the Kehilla representatives toward the wretched, exhausted, starved public... The slogan: bread for all!! Let's join forces in war against the accursed Kehilla parasite... – Demonstration Leaflet

== Death at the hands of the Sonderkommando ==
There are conflicting accounts regarding Rumkowski's final moments. According to one contemporary source he was murdered upon his arrival at Auschwitz by the Jews of Łódź who preceded him there. This version of events, however, has been challenged by historians. Another report, submitted by a Sonderkommando member from Hungary, Dov Paisikovic, states that the Jews of Łódź approached the Sonderkommando Jews in secrecy, and asked them to kill Rumkowski for the crimes he committed in the Łódź Ghetto, so they beat him to death at the gate of the Crematorium No. 2 and disposed of his corpse.

== Debate over Rumkowski's role in the Holocaust ==
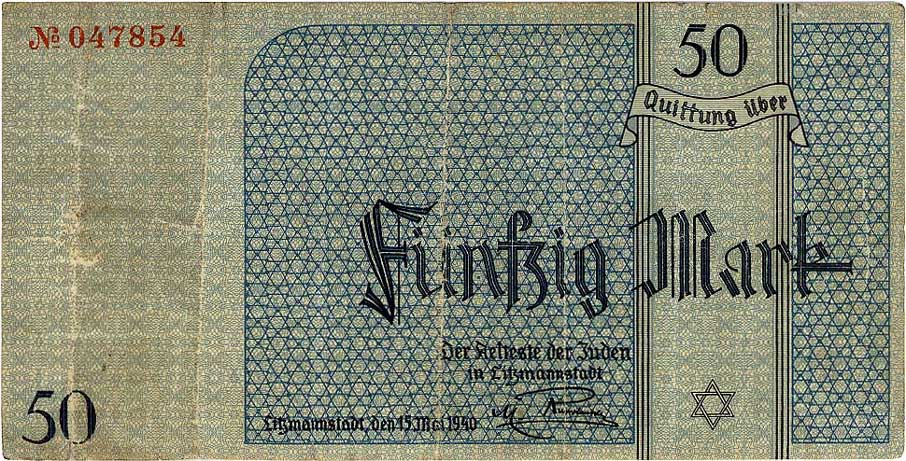
Token money in the ghetto with Rumkowski's signature

In his memoirs, Yehuda Leib Gerst described Rumkowski as a complex person: "This man had sickly leanings that clashed. Toward his fellow Jews, he was an incomparable tyrant who behaved just like a Führer and cast deathly terror to anyone who dared to oppose his lowly ways. Toward the perpetrators, however, he was as tender as a lamb and there was no limit to his base submission to all their demands, even if their purpose was to wipe us out totally. Either way, he did not properly understand his situation and position and their limits."

Historian Michal Unger, in her Reassessment of the Image of Mordechai Chaim Rumkowski (2004) explored the materials leading to his reputation. Rumkowski is described "on the one hand, an aggressive, domineering person, thirsty for honor and power, raucous, vulgar and ignorant, impatient (and) intolerant, impulsive and lustful. On the other hand, he is portrayed as a man of exceptional organizational prowess, quick, very energetic, and true to tasks that he set for himself." Research performed by Isaiah Trunk for the book Judenrat attempted to revise the prevailing view of Rumkowski as traitor and collaborationist.

Rumkowski took an active role in the deportations of Jews. Some historians and writers describe him as a traitor and as a Nazi collaborator; Rumkowski aimed at fulfilling the Nazi demands with the help of their own Orpo Security Police if necessary. His rule, unlike the leaders of other ghettos, was marked with abuse of his own people coupled with physical liquidation of political opponents. He and his council had a comfortable food ration and their own special shops. He was known to get rid of those he personally disliked by sending them to the camps. Additionally, he sexually abused vulnerable girls under his charge. Failure to submit to him meant death to the girl. Holocaust survivor Lucille Eichengreen, who claimed to have been abused by him for months as a young woman working in his office, said, "I felt disgusted and I felt angry, I ah, but if I would have run away he would have had me deported, I mean that was very clear."

Primo Levi, an Auschwitz survivor, in his book The Drowned and the Saved, concludes: "Had he survived his own tragedy...no tribunal would have absolved him, nor, certainly, can we absolve him on the moral plane. But there are extenuating circumstances: an infernal order such as National Socialism exercises a frightful power of corruption against which it is difficult to guard oneself. To resist it requires a truly solid moral armature, and the one available to Chaim Rumkowski...was fragile." At best, Levi viewed Rumkowski as morally ambiguous and self deluded. Hannah Arendt, in her book Eichmann in Jerusalem, placed Rumkowski's egotism at the low end of the spectrum of wartime ghetto leadership examples.

Professor Yehuda Bauer argues that if the Russians had continued their summer offensive in 1944, Łódź might have been the only ghetto to be liberated with a significant number of its inhabitants still alive, and Rumkowski might be remembered in a very different light.

== See also ==
- The Story of Chaim Rumkowski and the Jews of Lodz – a 1982 documentary
- Adam Czerniaków, head of Judenrat in the Warsaw Ghetto
- Internalized oppression
- Respectability politics
