= Łódź Ghetto mark =

Currency forced on the inmates of the Łódź Ghetto

Łódź Ghetto mark (German: Mark, Polish: Marka getta łódzkiego) was a surrogate currency that circulated in the Łódź Ghetto in 1940–1944 until the Ghetto was liquidated in August 1944. It was divided into 100 pfennig (German: pfennig). The notes had no value outside the Ghetto, and could not be exchanged into other currencies.

== Special ghetto currency ==
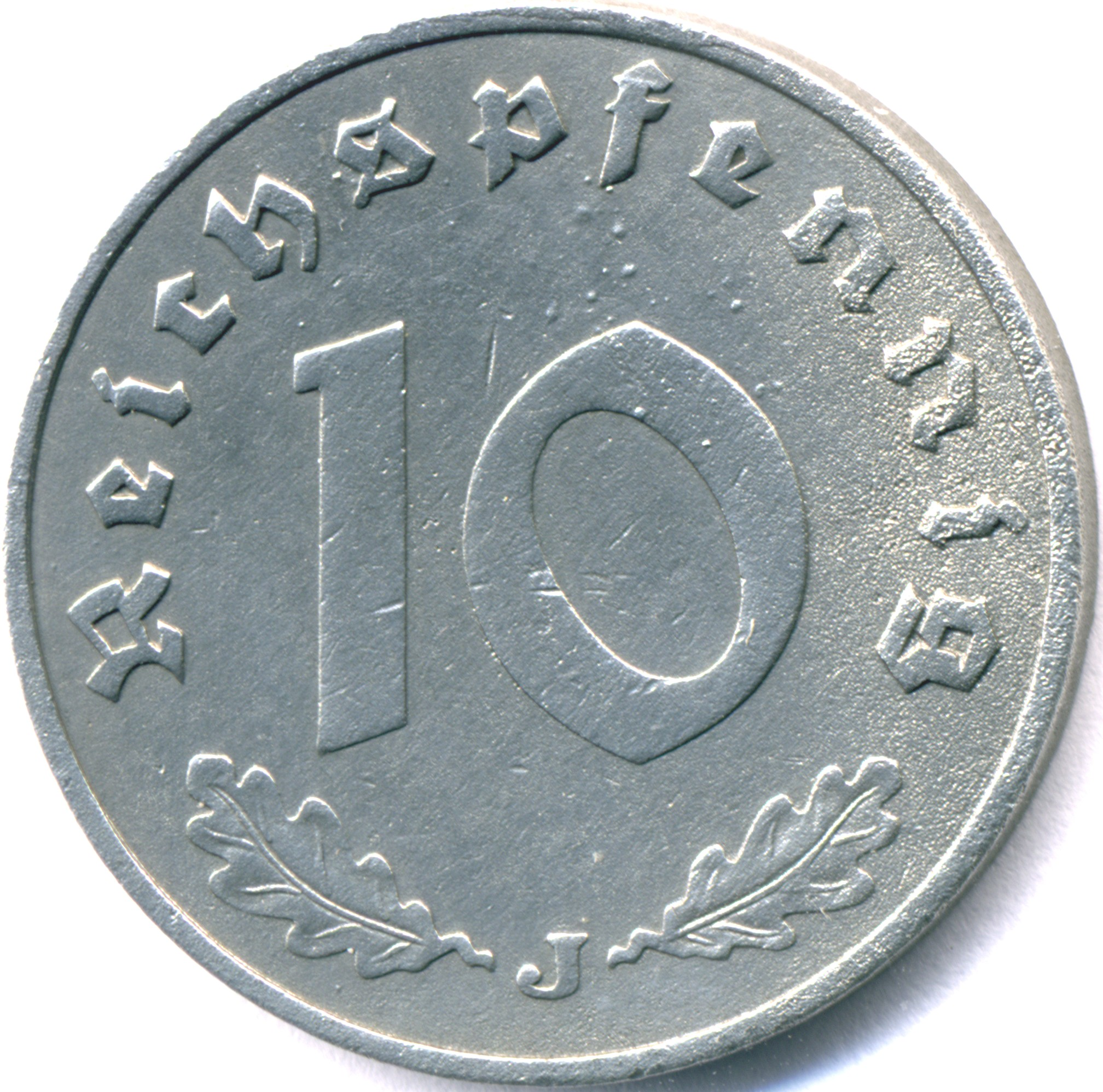
The 10 Rpf coin of the Third Reich was used as a prototype for the earliest Ghetto coins.

When the ghetto was established, its residents were compelled to surrender their cash and valuable possessions in exchange for the ghetto mark. In contrast, other significant ghettos in Poland adopted a distinct approach, permitting the use of Polish zloty banknotes and small denominations of the German Reichsmark with unique stamps indicating their exclusive validity within the confines of the ghetto. This was an effective way to strip ghetto residents of their possessions while preventing them from fleeing. Outside of Poland, only the Terezin Ghetto is known to have used its own surrogate currency.

The earliest 10 pfennig coins' design strongly resembled the Reichspfennig of the Third Reich, and the occupation authorities demanded a new design. Further coins were designed by Morduch Glazer (1890–1950).

The initial design of the banknotes was proposed by Wincenty Brauner, a member of the pre-war art group Jung Jidysz, and featured a man breaking apart his chains; this design was rejected by German authorities. The final design was developed by Ignacy Gutman, head of the Ghetto's construction department: it featured a Menorah and a Star of David in the corner. Printing forms for coins were engraved by Pinkus Szwarc.

Order #70 of June 24, 1940, was issued by Chaim Rumkowski, and urged Ghetto residents to exchange their money into the Ghetto marks. The use of other money in the Ghetto was punishable by death.

== Coins ==
- Coins were issued in the following denominations: 10 pfennig, 5, 10 and 20 mark.

Łódź Ghetto coins
Year	Nominal	Image	Metal	Diameter	Weight	Circulation	Edge	# in Parchimowicz catalog	Note
1942	10 pfennig		AL-Mg	19,1	0,76	100 000	smooth	13	
1942	10 pfennig		AL-Mg	21	0,76	100 000	smooth	13	smooth
1943	5 mark		AL	22,5	1,57	32 000 000	smooth	14a	includes 14b
1943	5 mark		AL-Mg	22,7	1,03	32 000 000	smooth	14b includes 14a	
1943	10 mark		AL	28,3	2,6	100 000	smooth	15a	thickness 1.6–1.7 mm includes 15b and 15c
1943	10 mark		AL	28,3	3,4	100 000	smooth	15b	thickness 2.1–2.2 mm includes 15a and 15c
1943	10 mark		AL-Mg	28,3	3,4	100 000	smooth	15c	thickness 2.1–2.2 mm includes 15a and 15b
1943	20 mark		AL	33,45	6,98	600	smooth	16	

== Banknotes ==
- Notes were issued in the following denominations: 50 pfennig, 1, 2, 5, 10, 20 and 50 mark.

Łódź Ghetto banknotes
Emission date	Series	Nominal	Obverse	Reverse	# in catalog of Parchimowicz/Borkowski
May 15, 1940		50 pfennig			156
May 15, 1940		1 mark			157
May 15, 1940	A	1 mark			157
May 15, 1940		2 mark			158
May 15, 1940		5 mark			159
May 15, 1940		10 mark			160
May 15, 1940		20 mark			161
May 15, 1940		50 mark			162
