= Jacqueline Hassink =

Dutch visual artist (1966–2018)

- Born: 15 July 1966; Enschede, Netherlands
- Died: 22 November 2018 (aged 52); Amsterdam, Netherlands
- Education: Willem de Kooning Academy, Rotterdam; Royal Art Academy of Art, The Hague; Trondheim Academy of Fine Art
- Known for: Visual arts; Photography, Conceptual art, Installation art, Film

Jacqueline Hassink (15 July 1966 – 22 November 2018) was a Dutch visual artist based in New York City.

== Early life and education ==
Hassink was born in Enschede, the Netherlands and received training at Willem de Kooning Academy in Rotterdam, Royal Academy of Art, The Hague, and the Trondheim Academy of Fine Art.

== Career ==
While Hassink trained as a sculptor, she worked mainly in photography. She created several global art projects on the theme of world economic power, and is known for projects like her first, The Table of Power (1993–95), in which she photographed the boardrooms of 21 of the largest multi-national corporations in Europe. She re-visited this topic in spring of 2009 after a global recession with The Table of Power 2 (2009–11). In Car Girls (2002–08), Hassink photographed women paid to pose with cars in cities including New York, Paris, Geneva, Tokyo, Detroit, and Shanghai, examining the differing beauty standards across cultures.

Other projects include: Female Power Stations: Queen Bees (1996–2000), Haute Couture Fitting Rooms, Paris (2003–12), View Kyoto (2015) and Unwired (2018). Hassink's work has been exhibited at Huis Marseille in Amsterdam; Fotomuseum Winterthur, Winterthur; ICP in New York;Tokyo Metropolitan Museum of Photography, Tokyo; the Victoria and Albert Museum in London and the Guangzhou Museum of Modern Art, Guangzhou.

Hassink participated in the Prix Pictet 2012, a project dedicated to photography and sustainability. Her follow-up book, The Table of Power 2, was nominated for the 2012 Paris Photo/ Aperture Book Award. The book appeared on the shortlist for the PHotoEspaña Best Photography Book of the Year Award, and received special mention though it did not win the award. Hassink's work has appeared in The Financial Times, Le Monde, The New York Times, El País, Frankfurter Allgemeine, Süddeutsche Zeitung, Reuters, Financial Times Deutschland, D2, De Standaard, NZZ, Newsweek and Wired.

Hassink was a visiting lecturer at Harvard University in conceptual photography and at the International Center for Photography in New York.

She died of cancer on 22 November 2018.

== Books ==
- The Table of Power, Menno van de Koppel, (Amsterdam), February 1996, ISBN 978-9-07392-614-1 and September 2000, ISBN 978-9-07392-623-3
- Female Power Stations: Queen Bees, Menno van de Koppel (Amsterdam), October 1999, ISBN 978-9-0739-2622-6
- Mindscapes, Birkhäuser Verlag (Basel), March 2003, ISBN 978-3-7643-6993-4
- The Power Book. London: Chris Boot, 2007, ISBN 978-1-9057-1207-6
- Domains of Influence, I.B. Tauris (London), June 2008, ISBN 978-1-8451-1659-0
- Quarry Walls, self-published, July 2008. OCLC 566109763
- Car Girls, Aperture, April 2009, ISBN 978-1-59711-097-6
- Car Girls pocket edition, Aperture, September 2009, ISBN 978-1-5971-1106-5
- The Table of Power 2, Hatje Cantz, December 2011, ISBN 978-3-7757-3214-7
  - The Table of Power 2 Special Edition I (walnut), Hatje Cantz, January 2012, ISBN 978-3-7757-3333-5
  - The Table of Power 2 Special Edition II (cherry), Hatje Cantz, January 2012, ISBN 978-3-7757-3334-2
  - The Table of Power 2 Special Edition III (red gum), Hatje Cantz, January 2012, ISBN 978-3-7757-3335-9
- Black Walls, self-published, November 2012
- View, Kyoto, Hatje Cantz, March 2015, ISBN 978-3-7757-3910-8
- Unwired, Hatje Cantz, March 2018, ISBN 978-3-7757-4398-3
