= Charlie Crane =

English photographer and director

Charlie Crane is a published photographer and director based in London.

Crane was born in London, England. His book Welcome to Pyongyang (Chris Boot, 2007) focused on his visits to North Korea with the help of North Korea expert Nick Bonner. He has won several awards for his photography including the 2007 Lucie Award, Magenta Foundation Flash Forward, Bloomberg New Contemporaries and British Journal of Photography Annual Award.

He is signed to London-based production company Knucklehead and has directed broadcast commercials for brands including Howies, Hitachi, COI, O2 UK, TV Licensing, Twinings and LoveFilm. For his work in COI he won a Bronze award at the British Television Advertising Awards.
