= Henryk Ross =

Polish Jewish photographer who documented the Łódź Ghetto

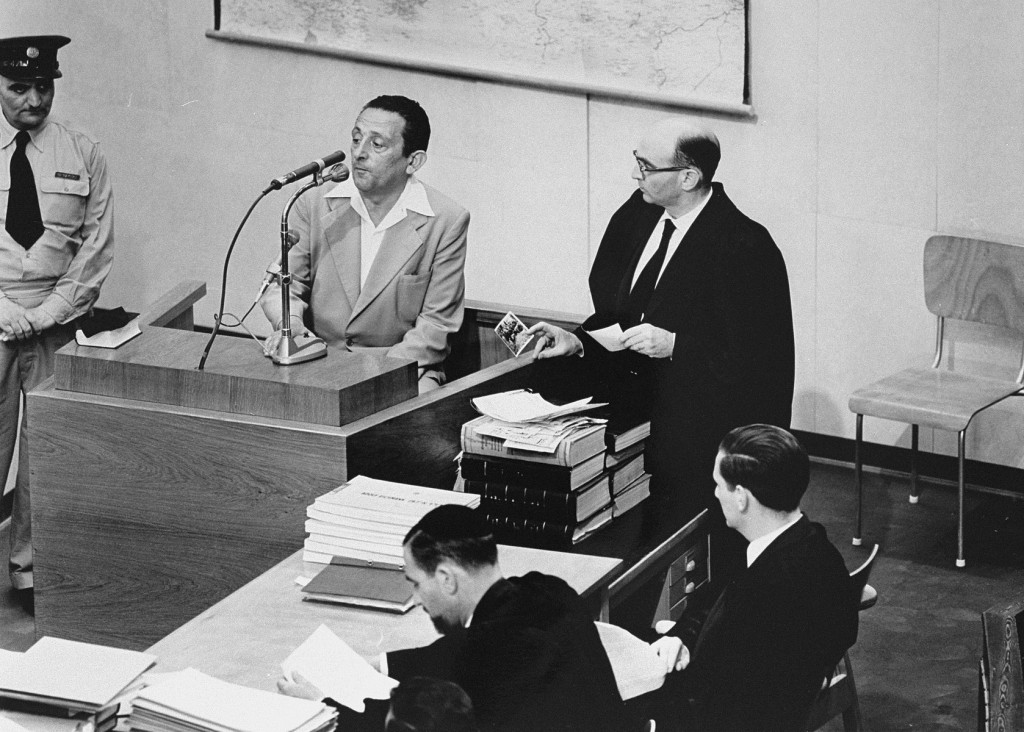
- Witness Henryk Ross questioned by Gideon Hausner during Eichmann-Trial (1961)
- Born: 1 May 1910
- Died: 1991 (aged 80–81)
- Known for: Staff photographer for Judenrat, Łódź Ghetto
- Spouse: Stefania Schoenberg (m. 1941)

Henryk Ross (1 May 1910 – 1991) was a Polish Jewish photographer who was employed by the Department of Statistics for the Jewish Council within the Łódź Ghetto during the Holocaust in occupied Poland.

== About ==
Ross was born in 1910. Ross was a sports photographer for a Warsaw newspaper, prior to World War II.

Starting in 1940, Ross had been employed by the Department of Statistics for the Jewish Council within the Łódź Ghetto during the Holocaust in occupied Poland. Daringly, working as staff photographer, Ross also documented Nazi atrocities (such as public hangings) while remaining officially in the good graces of the German occupational administration.

Part of his official duties was taking identity photographs. He constructed a three level stage in his studio that let him photograph up to twelve people with a single negative. While the authorities supplied him with only enough film for assigned work, this trick allowed him extra film he could use for unauthorized photography.

His unofficial images covered scenes from daily life, communal celebrations, children digging for scraps of food and large groups of Jews being led to deportation and being loaded into box cars.

In 1944, the Nazis started the liquidation of the Lodz ghetto and the deportation of the remaining Jews from it to Chelmno and Auschwitz. In the fall of 1944, Ross buried his photos and negatives in a box, hoping they might survive as a historical record. 800 Jews, including Henryk Ross, were temporarily left in the ghetto in order to clean it (8 mass graves were already prepared for them). But the Nazis did not manage to murder them before the liberation of the ghetto by the Red Army in January 1945. Ross was able to dig up the box with the photos. Much of his material was damaged or destroyed by water; still, about half of his 6,000 images survived.

Ross in 1950 emigrated to Israel and testified during the 1961 trial of Adolf Eichmann. He died in 1991.

== Legacy ==
In 2021, a gift of 48 of Ross's silver gelatin prints were given to the Museum of Fine Arts, Boston (MFA), which makes it one of the few US museums to own work by Ross.

== Sources ==
- Isaiah Trunk (2008) [2006]. Łódź Ghetto: A History (Google Books, preview). Bloomington, Ind: Indiana University Press. ISBN 9780253219930.
- Ross, Henryk (2004). Chris Boot (ed.). Lodz Ghetto Album. London. ISBN 0-9542813-7-3.

== Links ==
- The Lodz Ghetto Photographs of Henryk Ross
