= Chris Boot =

British book publisher (born 1960)

Chris Boot (born 27 May 1960) is a British photography curator, book publisher, and has worked in a variety of other roles related to photography. He was director of London’s Photo Co-op, director of the London and New York offices of Magnum Photos, editorial director at Phaidon Press, founder of Chris Boot Ltd. a photography book publisher, and is now executive director of Aperture Foundation. In these roles he has commissioned, edited or published a number of noteworthy photography books.

== Life and work ==
Boot was born on 27 May 1960 in Kynnersley, Shropshire, England. He has a BA in photography from the Polytechnic of Central London, and a BA in English literature from the Royal Holloway College, University of London.

Between 1984 and 1990, Boot was director of London’s Photo Co-op (since renamed Photofusion), an independent photography resource center and gallery.

In 1990, he moved to Magnum Photos where he became director of its London and then, in 1995, of its New York office, until 1998.

He was editorial director at Phaidon Press from 1998 to 2000. While at Phaidon, he wrote and edited Magnum Stories; edited Robert Capa, the Definitive Collection by Richard Whelan and the Phaidon 55 series of books from 2001 onwards, which included volumes on Nan Goldin, Mary Ellen Mark, Shomei Tomatsu, Dorothea Lange and W. Eugene Smith and Walker Evans; and commissioned The Photobook: A History by Martin Parr and Gerry Badger, Boring Postcards from the collection of Martin Parr, Outland by Roger Ballen, Snaps by Elliott Erwitt, and Heaven and Earth by David Malin and Katherine Roucoux.

In 2001, he founded Chris Boot Ltd. in London, producing and publishing some forty photography books independently until 2011.

From January 2011 until May 2021, Boot was executive director of Aperture Foundation in New York.

In 2024, Boot received an RPS (The Royal Photographic Society) Award for Photography Publishing.

== Books commissioned or edited by Boot apart from those published by Chris Boot Ltd. ==
- Bodies of Experience – Stories about Living with HIV & AIDS (Camera Work, 1989).
- Humanity and Inhumanity by George Rodger (Phaidon, 1994).
- Living Apart by Ian Berry (Phaidon, 1996).
- Israel, 50 Years As Seen by Magnum Photographers (Aperture, 1998).
- Boring Postcards (Phaidon, 1999).
- South Southeast by Steve McCurry (Phaidon, 2000).
- Phaidon 55 series (Phaidon, 2001 onwards).
- A Broken Landscape – HIV and AIDS in Africa by Gideon Mendel (Network/Action Aid, 2001).
- Heaven and Earth by David Malin and Katherine Roucoux (Phaidon, 2002).
- The Photobook: A History Vol. 1 by Martin Parr and Gerry Badger (Phaidon, 2004).
- The Fat Baby by Eugene Richards (Phaidon, 2004).
- Magnum Stories written and edited by Boot. (Phaidon, 2004).

== Chris Boot Ltd. ==
His company Chris Boot Ltd., a London-based photographic publishing house and exhibition producer, launched in 2001 and operated until 2011. It published Lodz Ghetto Album by Henryk Ross (2004) and Things as They Are: Photojournalism in Context Since 1955 by Mary Panzer and fr:Christian Caujolle (2005), both of which won the ICP Infinity Award.

When Boot left in 2011 his assistant Maxwell Anderson took over management and no new projects were initiated.

Chris Boot Ltd. published the following books of photography:

- History by Luc Delahaye (2003).
- Our True Intent Is All for Your Delight (2003).
- Lodz Ghetto Album by Henryk Ross (2004).
- Meetings by Paul Shambroom (2004).
- No Man's Land by Larry Towell (2004).
- Objects of Beauty by Joy Gregory (2004).
- Postcards Home by Ingrid Pollard (2004).
- Saddam Hussein Watches from the collection of Martin Parr (2004).
- James and Other Apes. Mini Version by James Mollison (2004, 2006).
- Field Studies by Stephen Gill (2004).
- Tony Ray-Jones. Text by Russell Roberts (2004).
- Things as They Are: Photojournalism in Context Since 1955 by Mary Panzer and fr:Christian Caujolle (Boot/Aperture/World Press Photo, 2005).
- Our True Intent Is All for Your Delight: The John Hinde Butlin's Photographs. Photographs by the John Hinde Studio. (2005).
- In the Wake of Katrina by Larry Towell (2006).
- People by Stefan Ruiz (2006).
- The British Landscape by John Davies (2006).
- I'm a Real Photographer. Keith Arnatt Photographs 1976-2002 by Keith Arnatt (2007).
- Welcome to Pyongyang by Charlie Crane (2007).
- Motherland by Simon Roberts (2007, 2009).
- Parking Spaces by Martin Parr (2007).
- The Memory of Pablo Escobar by James Mollison (2007).
- Beaufort West by Mikhael Subotzky (2008, 2009).
- The World from My Front Porch by Larry Towell (2008).
- The Disciples by James Mollison (2008, 2011).
- James and Other Apes by James Mollison (2009).
- The Memory of Pablo Escobar by James Mollison (2009).
- We English by Simon Roberts (2009).
- Luxury by Martin Parr (2009)
- The Power Book by Jacqueline Hassink (2009).
- Georgian Spring: A Magnum Journal (2009).
- Bliss by Martin Parr (2009).
- Alter Ego by Robbie Cooper (2009).
- Playas by Martin Parr (2009, 2010).
- Postcards by Martin Parr (2010).
- San Francisco Berlin by Stefan Ruiz (2010).
- Where Children Sleep by James Mollison (2010).
- Maske by Phyllis Galembo (2010).
- Infidel by Tim Hetherington (2010).
- The Disciples by James Mollison (2011).
