= Robbie Cooper =

British artist

Robbie Cooper (born 1969) is a British artist working in various media, including photography, video and video game modifications.

He was educated in Kenya and the UK, before studying media production at Bournemouth College of Art. In 2002 Cooper embarked on Alter Ego, a long-term project that explored virtual online worlds and the identities people create within them. His Alter Ego photographs have been exhibited internationally and were published as a book in 2007. Each portrait includes text written by the subject that records their online experiences. In 2008 Cooper began the Immersion project, in which he records the expressions of people watching TV, playing video games and using the internet. "Cooper's work creates a dual feedback: the players react intensely to the images they see on the screen, whereas we - the observers - react with our own feelings to their powerfully emotional facial expressions that to us, in turn, are just another image on a screen". The project captures people of all ages immersed in digital media. Media used in the Immersion project include video games, pornography, children's cartoons, comedy, atrocity videos, sports, horror and music videos.

== Immersion technique ==
The technique used by Robbie Cooper for Immersion is inspired by a method developed by documentary filmmaker Errol Morris. Known as the Interrotron method, Morris used the process to interview people directly through the camera lens. A modified autocue, the Interrotron uses a one-way mirror to reflect an image towards the viewer whilst they gaze into the camera. Morris connected a live video feed of himself into the Interrotron so he could ask questions and the interviewee could retain direct eye contact with him, whilst expressing themselves straight to the camera and the audience. Cooper adapted this approach, plugging video games consoles and computers into the autocue, as well as creating a studio environment which he has described as an "anti-shoot", in which the attention of subjects is diverted away from the purpose of the activity. In 2011 Cooper worked as a consultant on the Godfrey Reggio/Philip Glass movie "Visitors", which used the technique extensively.

== Publications ==
Alter Ego: Avatars and their Creators. London: Chris Boot. 2007. ISBN 978-1-905712-02-1

== Exhibitions ==
1. National Science and Media Museum, UK. "Immersion", Robbie Cooper 2010.

2. Centro Di Cultura Contemporanea, Palazzo Strozzi, Florence, Italy. "Virtual Identities" 2011.

3. Museum der Moderne, Salzburg, Austria. "Role Models - Role Playing" 2011.

4. Maison D'Ailleurs, Switzerland. "Playtime, Video Game Mythologies" 2012.

5. Kunstlerhaus, Vienna, Austria. "Megacool 4.0 Jugend und Kunst" 2012.

6. Multimedia Art Museum, Moscow. "Playtime, Video Game Mythologies" 2013.

7. The Ansembourg Museum, Liège, Belgium. BIP 9th International Biennial Of Photography And Visual Arts "Mirages" 2014.

8. Galleria Giovanni Bonelli, Milan, Italy. Prosecco e Pop Corn "Specchio Riflesso" 2014.
