= Hans Biebow =

Nazi administrator (1902–1947)

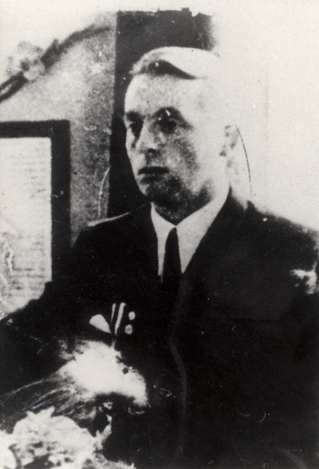
Hans Biebow

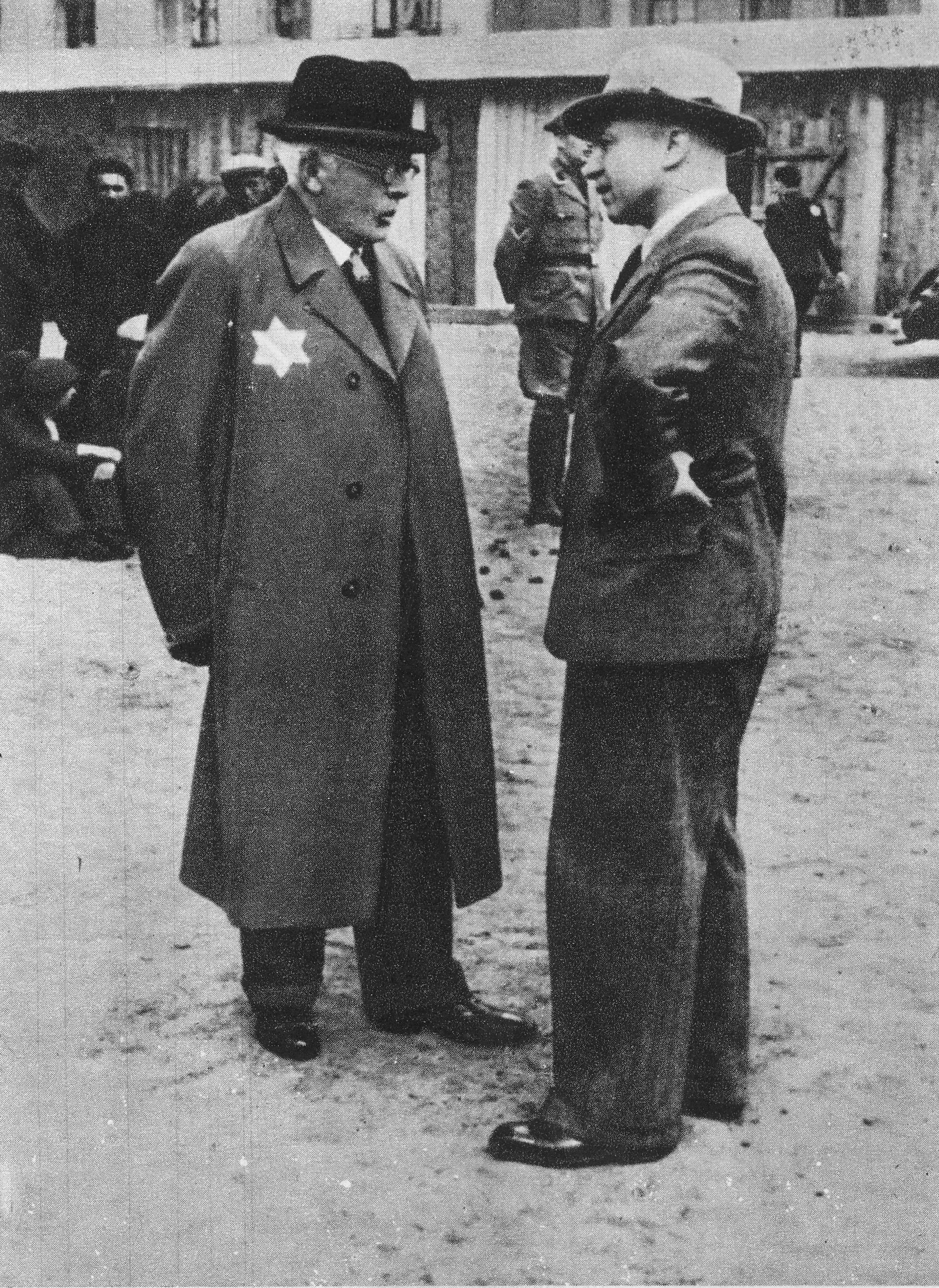
Hans Biebow (right) and Chaim Rumkowski in the Litzmannstadt Ghetto

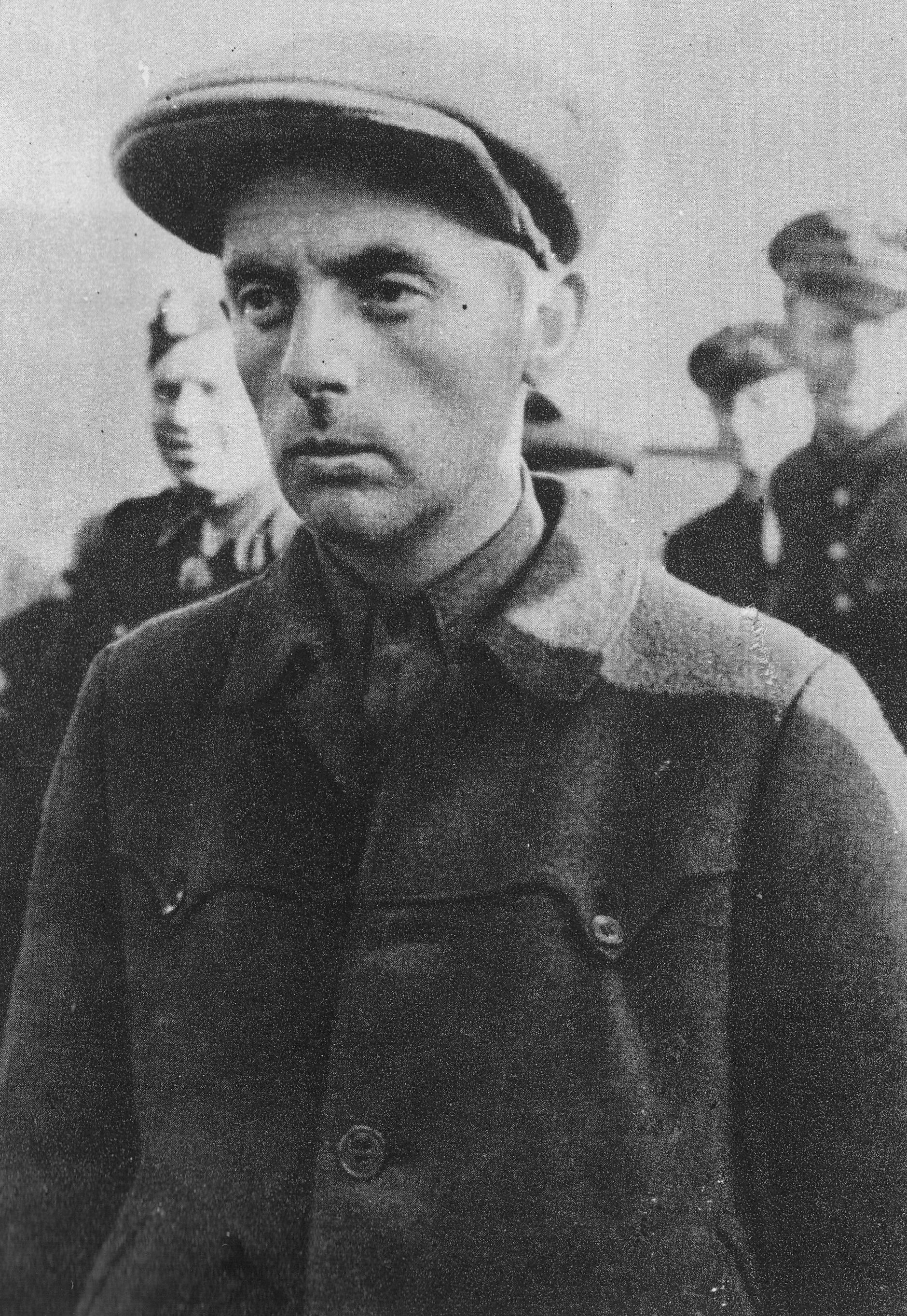
Hans Biebow during his trial in 1947

Hans Biebow (December 18, 1902 – June 23, 1947) was the chief of German Nazi administration of the Łódź Ghetto in occupied Poland.

Biebow's early life is summarized by the following curriculum vitae which he submitted to the German Ghetto Administration (German: Gettoverwaltung) on May 10, 1940:

I was born December 18, 1902, in Bremen, the son of Julius Biebow, an insurance company director. After graduating from secondary school, I entered my father's company – the district branch of the Stuttgart Insurance Company – as an apprentice, planning on eventually assuming my father's post. I received thorough training, remaining there an additional year as an employee. Since the insurance business had come almost completely to a standstill during the inflation, I then gave up my position to join the cereal and foodstuff bank in Bremen as a trainee. From there I went into the cereal business and stayed in this trade until I was 22. I should mention that I managed a large branch of an Eichsfeld cereal company in Göttingen for half a year. When the inflation ended, I became particularly interested in the reviving coffee trade. After a short training period with a business friend of my father's, I opened my own business with very little capital, building it, in the course of 18 years, into one of the largest such companies in Germany. At the end I employed about 250 workers and office personnel.

After working as a coffee importer in his hometown of Bremen, Biebow became the overseer of the Litzmannstadt Ghetto. He realized that the ghetto could make a profit for the Germans if it were converted into essentially a slave labor complex.

Under his administration, the 164,000 Jews of Poland's second largest city were crammed into a small area of the city. Communication between the ghetto inhabitants and the outside world was completely cut off and the supply of food was severely limited, ensuring that many of the residents would slowly starve. Over the course of its existence, the population swelled to 204,000, with more Jews from central Europe being sent there. The Ghetto Administration remained in operation from April 1940 until the summer of 1944.

Biebow exercised his control in part through a Jewish administration headed by Mordechai Chaim Rumkowski. Rumkowski believed that the Jews could survive if they produced cheap, essential goods for the Nazis. Biebow profited substantially from the sale of the products of Jewish labour, as well as from property seized from Jews. He was directly responsible for starving the population, and he assisted the Gestapo in rounding up Jews for deportation. The ghetto factories produced products such as boots for German soldiers and were profitable for the Germans because the Jews, cut off from all resources, worked for wages that consisted only of bread, soup, and other essentials.

The inhabitants endured four years of starvation, illness and overcrowding before being sent to the extermination camps of Chełmno and Auschwitz. Among the Nazi hierarchy, Biebow was an early exponent of using the Jews as cheap labor rather than killing them, but he readily accepted the extermination policy. Survivors report he encouraged the last surviving Jews of the ghetto in the summer of 1944 to board the trains to Auschwitz with a speech that began "My Jews..." and promised them work in the west. Of the 245,000 inhabitants, 877 Jews remained when the Łódź ghetto was liberated by Soviet forces on January 19, 1945. In the days just before the liberation of Łódź, Biebow ordered large burial pits to be dug in the local cemetery, intending for the Gestapo to execute the 877 Jews, who served as a clean-up crew in the ghetto. This might have been an attempt by Biebow to eliminate witnesses to his role in the atrocities.

Biebow was able to escape into hiding in Germany in 1945 after the unconditional surrender, but was recognized by a survivor of the ghetto and subsequently arrested in Bremen. After he was extradited by the Allies to Łódź, he stood trial from April 23 to April 30, 1947. He was found guilty on all counts and executed by hanging on June 23, 1947.

== See also ==
- Glossary of Nazi Germany
- List of Nazi Party leaders and officials
