= Stanisława Leszczyńska =

Polish midwife (1896–1974)

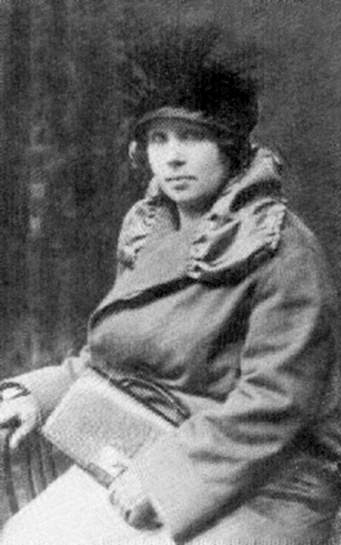
- Leszczyńska before World War II
- Born: 8 May 1896; Łódź, Poland
- Died: 11 March 1974 (aged 77)
- Occupation: Midwife
- Known for: Prisoner at Auschwitz
- Spouse: Bronisław Leszczyński

Stanisława Leszczyńska (Polish: [sta.ɲiˈswa.va lɛʂˈt͡ʂɘ̟ɲ.ska]; 8 May 1896 – 11 March 1974) was a Polish midwife who was incarcerated at the Auschwitz concentration camp during World War II, where she delivered over 3,000 children. Her beatification process was opened in 2015.

== Life ==
Stanisława Leszczyńska was born to a Polish Catholic family of carpenter Jan Zambrzycki and his wife Henryka, in the Bałuty neighborhood of Łódź in the Vistula Land under the Tsarist rule. Her father was drafted into the imperial army when she was a child, and sent to Turkestan. To make ends meet, her mother worked 12-hour shifts at the Poznański factory; her earnings allowed Stanisława to go to a private school where Polish was the medium of instruction. Upon her father's return to Poland, the family left for Brazil in 1908 seeking greater economic opportunity, and stayed in Rio de Janeiro. They returned after two years. Stanisława completed high-school in 1914, just as the First World War broke out. Her father was drafted again. She stayed with her mother and two younger brothers. On October 17, 1916 Stanisława married printer Bronisław Leszczyński.

She gave birth to son Bronisław in 1917, and two years later, daughter Sylwia. In 1920 the family relocated to Warsaw. Stanisława enrolled at the midwife college and completed her studies with an Alumnae Achievement Award in 1922. They moved back to Łódź. She got a job as a midwife, and in the same year gave birth to her second son Stanisław. In 1923 her third son, Henryk, was born.

After the invasion of Poland by Nazi Germany at the onset of World War II, the Leszczyński family was forced to relocate to Wspólna 3 Street when the Łódź Ghetto was created for the Jews by the Nazi occupation administration. Żurawia Street, where they used to live, became part of the ghetto area. The Leszczyńskis began helping ghettoized Jews by delivering food items and false documents. However, Stanisława was caught red-handed, and brought to the Gestapo on February 18, 1943. Her younger children, Sylwia, Stanisław, and Henryk were also arrested. Her husband and son Bronisław managed to avoid capture and fled the city. The Nazis sent the two boys as slave labour to the stone quarries of Mauthausen-Gusen concentration camp. Leszczyńska never saw her husband again; he died in the Warsaw Uprising.

== Auschwitz concentration camp ==
After interrogation by the Gestapo, Stanisława Leszczyńska and her 24-year-old daughter Sylwia were transported to the Auschwitz concentration camp on April 17, 1943, and tattooed with the camp numbers 41335 and 41336 respectively. Stanisława was relegated to the women's camp infirmary along with her daughter, who had been a medical student before the war broke out. Stanisława met Dr Mengele, and was advised to write reports about birth problems and diseases in the childbed.

Years later, she described how she put her life at risk to save newborns in a work called Raport położnej z Oświęcimia (The Report of a Midwife from Auschwitz). In this record she mentions the meeting with Mengele who requested from her a report about childbed fever cases and cases of death during the accouchements. She also described how the newborns were snatched away, taken to another room, and drowned in a barrel by Schwester Klara, who was imprisoned at Auschwitz for infanticide, and her assistant, Schwester Pfani. Of the 3,000 she delivered, some 2,500 newborns perished; a few hundred others with blue eyes were sent away to be Germanised. Only about 30 infants survived in the care of their mothers. Expectant mothers did not realize what was going to happen to their babies and many traded their meager rations for fabric to be used for diapers after the birth. Stanisława remained the camp's midwife until it was liberated on January 26, 1945.

== Later life ==
Leszczyńska returned to Łódź, and her children also arrived there from the forced labour camps. She settled in an apartment at 99 Zgierska Street and continued working as a midwife locally. Remembering Auschwitz, she prayed over every child she delivered. On January 27, 1970 Stanisława attended an official celebration in Warsaw, where she met the women prisoners of Auschwitz and their grown-up children who had been born in the camp. She died four years later.

== Remembrance ==
Several hospitals and organizations in Poland are named after Stanisława; the main road at Auschwitz concentration camp museum is named after her; and so is a street in the city of Łódź. In 1983 the School of Obstetricians in Kraków was named in her honor.

== Sainthood ==
T he Archdiocese of Łódź formally opened her beatification process in the early 1990s and her cause is currently under review with the Vatican.

She is currently recognized as a Servant of God in the Catholic Church, but has not yet been beatified or canonized. On 11 March 2024, the archdiocese completed the formal local investigation into her life and virtues. Almost 1,200 pages of evidence and witness testimony were submitted to Vatican's Dicastery for the Causes of Saints in April 2024. If she is found to have lived a life of heroic virtue, she would earn the title of Venerable and await news of a confirmed miracle before she can be beatified.

== Published works ==
- Stanisława Leszczyńska, Raport położnej z Oświęcimia (The Report of a Midwife from Auschwitz), Przegląd Lekarski, Nr 1, 1965.

== Sources ==
- Kazimierz Gabryel (2003). Stanisława Leszczyńska: 1896–1974 (in Polish). Diecezjalne Wydawn. Łodzkie. ISBN 9788385022046.
