= August Frank memorandum =

1942 directive by Nazi German official August Frank regarding the Holocaust

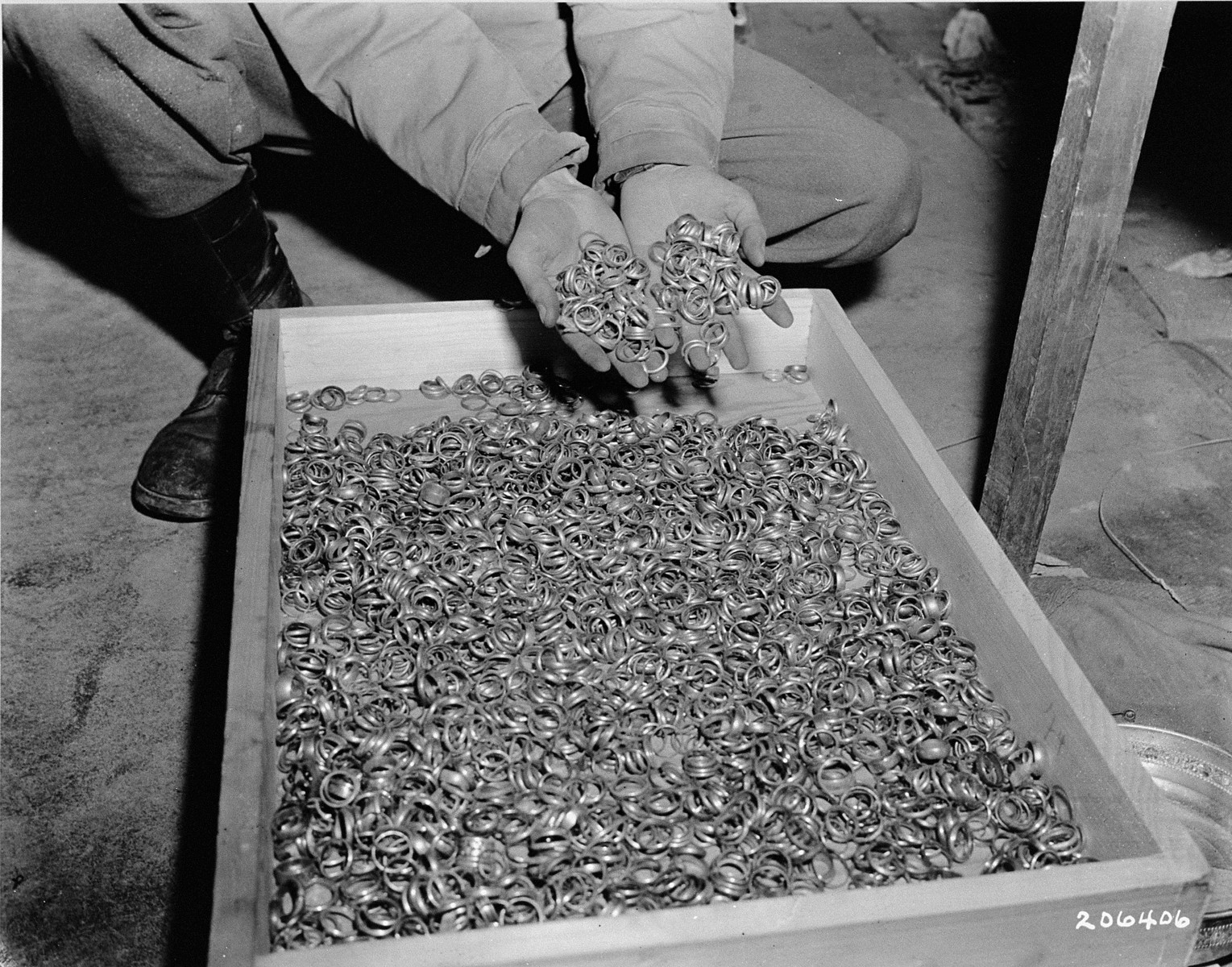
The Reichsbank used to bank the gold rings of Buchenwald victims for the SS, 5 May 1945

The August Frank memorandum of 26 September 1942 was a directive from SS Lieutenant General (Obergruppenführer) August Frank of the SS concentration camp administration department (SS-WVHA). The memorandum provides a measure of the detailed planning that Frank and other Nazis put into the carrying out of the Holocaust. It includes instructions as to the disposition of postage stamp collections and underwear of the murdered Jews. It is clear that the Nazis were intent on removing everything of value from their victims.

The memorandum contains an instruction that the yellow stars that the Nazis forced Jews to wear on their clothing were to be removed before the clothing was redistributed to ethnic Germans whom the Nazis were resettling into occupied Poland. This memorandum, when it came to light after the war, played a key role in refuting Frank's claims that he had no knowledge that Jews were being murdered en masse in the extermination camps of Operation Reinhard.

== Text of the memorandum ==
The top secret memorandum, printed in multiple copies, was sent to the Chief of the SS Garrison Administration Lublin, and to the Chief of Administration Concentration Camp Auschwitz among others. English translation, provided by the Nuremberg Military Tribunal during the Trials of War Criminals:

Without taking into account the overall regulations which are expected to be issued during October, pertaining to the utilization of mobile and immobile property of the evacuated Jews, the following procedure has to be followed with regard to the property carried by them — property, which will in all orders in the future be called goods originating from thefts, receiving of stolen goods, and hoarded goods:

1. a. Cash money in Reichsbank notes have to be paid into the account: Economic and Administrative Main Office 158/1488 with the Reich Bank in Berlin-Schoeneberg.
b. Foreign exchange (coined or uncoined), rare metals, jewelry, precious and semi-precious stones, pearls, gold from teeth and scrap gold have to be delivered to the SS Economic and Administrative Main Office. The latter is responsible for the immediate delivery to the Reichsbank.
c. Watches and clocks of all kinds, alarm clocks, fountain pens, mechanical pencils, hand and electrical razors, pocketknives, scissors, flashlights, wallets, and purses are to be repaired by the Economic and Administrative Main Office in special repair shops, cleaned, and evaluated; and have to be delivered quickly to front line troops. Delivery to the troops is on a cash basis through the post exchanges. Three-fourth price grades are to be set and it has to be made sure that each officer and man cannot buy more than one watch. Exempt from sale are the gold watches, the utilization of which rests with me. The proceeds go to the Reich.
d. Men's underwear and men's clothing including footwear has to be sorted and valued. After covering the needs of the concentration camp inmates and in exceptions for the troops they are to be handed over to the Volksdeutsche Mittelstelle. The proceeds go to the Reich in all cases.
e. Women's clothing and women's underwear, including footwear; children's clothing and children's underwear, including footwear; have to be handed over to the Volksdeutsche Mittelstelle against payment. Underwear of pure silk is to be handed over to the Reich Ministry of Economics according to orders by the SS Economic and Administrative Main Office. This order refers also to underwear, under letter.
f. Featherbeds, quilts, woolen blankets, cloth for suits, shawls, umbrellas, walking sticks, thermos flasks, ear flaps, baby carriages, combs, handbags, leather belts, shopping baskets, tobacco pipes, sun glasses, mirrors, table knives, forks and spoons, knapsacks, and suitcases made from leather or artificial material are to be delivered to the Volksdeutsche Mittelstelle. The question of payment will be decided later.
The needs in quilts, woolen blankets, thermos flasks, ear flaps, combs, table knives, forks and spoons, and knapsacks can be furnished from Lublin and Auschwitz from these stocks against payment from budget funds.
g. Linen, such as bed sheets, bed linen, pillows, towels, wiping cloths, and tablecloths are to be handed over to the Volksdeutsche Mittelstelle against payment. Bed sheets, bed linen, towels, wiping cloths, and table cloths can be furnished for the needs of troops from these stocks against payment from budget funds.
h. Spectacles and eyeglasses of every kind are to be handed in to the medical office for utilization. (Spectacles with golden frames have to be handed in without glasses together with the rare metals). A settlement of accounts for the spectacles and eyeglasses need not take place with regard to their low value and their limited use.
i. Valuable furs of all kinds, raw and cured, are to be delivered to the SS-WVHA.
j. Ordinary furs (lamb, hare, and rabbit skins) are to be reported to the SS-WVHA, Amt B II, and are to be delivered to the clothing plant of the Waffen-SS, Ravensbrück near Fürstenberg (Mecklenburg).
k. All items mentioned under the letters d, e, and f, which have only one-fifth or two-fifths of the full value, or are useless altogether will be delivered via the SS-WVHA to the Reich Ministry for Economics for utilization.
For the decision on items which are not mentioned under the letters b-i, application for a decision as to their utilization should be made to the chief of the WVHA.

2. The SS-WVHA will establish all prices under observation of the legally controlled prices. This estimation, however, can be made later on. Petty evaluations which only waste time and personnel may be eliminated. Average prices for single items have to be established in general. For instance, one pair of used men's trousers 3.00 ℛℳ, one woolen blanket 6.00 ℛℳ, etc. For the delivery of useless items to the Reich Ministry for Economics, average Kilo prices will have to be established.

It has to be strictly observed, that the Jewish Star is removed from all garments and outer garments which are to be delivered. Furthermore, items which are to be delivered have to be searched for hidden and sewed-in values, this should be carried out with the greatest possible care.

— SS-Brigadeführer and Brigadier General of the Waffen SS FRANK
