= Friedrich Uebelhoer =

German Nazi politician and SS general

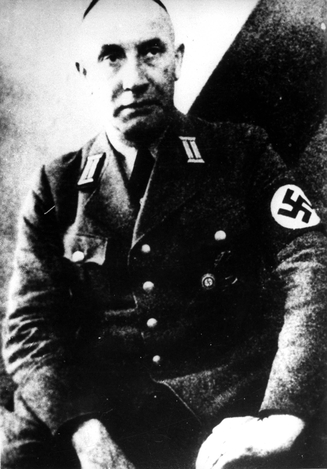
- Friedrich Uebelhoer, c. 1941–1942

Regierungspräsident, Merseburg district
- In office October 1943 – 8 May 1945

Regierungspräsident, Kalisz-Łódź
- In office March 1940 – December 1942

Oberbürgermeister, Naumburg
- In office 1933–1939

Personal details
- Born: 25 September 1893 Rothenburg ob der Tauber, Kingdom of Bavaria, German Empire
- Died: Declared dead 31 December 1950 (aged 57) unknown
- Party: Nazi Party
- Education: University of Freiburg; Würzburg University
- Civilian awards: Golden Party Badge

Military service
- Allegiance: German Empire; Nazi Germany
- Branch/service: Imperial German Army; Schutzstaffel
- Years of service: 1914–1918; 1933–1945
- Rank: SS-Brigadeführer
- Unit: 14th (Baden) Foot Artillery
- Battles/wars: World War I
- Military awards: Iron Cross, 1st and 2nd class

Friedrich Uebelhoer (25 September 1893 – legally declared dead 31 December 1950) was a German Nazi Party politician and an SS-Brigadeführer. During the Second World War, he served as the district president in Kalisz-Łódź and participated in Holocaust actions against the Jews and Romani people. He went missing in May 1945 and was legally declared dead in December 1950.

== Early life ==
Uebelhoer was born at Rothenburg ob der Tauber in the Kingdom of Bavaria. He was educated through the secondary school level, locally and at Wurzburg. He joined the 14th (Baden) Foot Artillery in Strassburg (today, Strasbourg) in 1914. He served as an officer in the Imperial German Army in the First World War. He fought on the western front, served as a staff officer with the 1st Infantry Division and earned the Iron Cross, 1st and 2nd class. After the war, he joined the Lettow-Vorbeck Freikorps. He then studied law and political science for six semesters at the University of Freiburg and the University of Würzburg . He worked in industry for ten years.

== Nazi Party career ==
Uebelhoer joined the Nazi Party initially in 1922, then again in 1925, following the revocation of the ban placed on it after the Beer Hall putsch. As an early Party member, he later would be awarded the Golden Party Badge. He became the Party Kreisleiter in Naumburg in 1931. He was Oberbürgermeister (mayor) of Naumburg from 1933 to 1939, as well as the Landrat (district administrator) and the head of the National Socialist People's Welfare in Gau Halle-Merseburg.

At the March 1933 parliamentary election, he was elected to the Reichstag from electoral constituency 11 (Merseburg). He would continue to hold this Reichstag seat until the fall of the Nazi regime.

== SS activity ==
Uebelhoer held the rank of SS-Brigadeführer in the Schutzstaffel and received commendation for his involvement in the annexation of the Sudetenland and for his part in the Anschluss. Following the conquest and occupation of Poland, he served as an inspector in the Reichsgau Wartheland. He ordered the construction of the Jewish ghetto in Łódź on 10 December 1939, a measure he described as only temporary, adding that ultimately the Nazis intended to "burn out this plague dump". In March 1940, he was made the Regierungspräsident (district president) of Kalisz-Łódź .

In early October 1941, Uebelhoer drew the ire of Reinhard Heydrich when he vehemently protested against the intended deportation of 60,000 German Jews to the already overcrowded ghetto. In a letter to Uebelhoer, Heydrich threatened to draw "appropriate conclusions" if Uebelhoer did not change his stance. Through negotiations with Adolf Eichmann, the number eventually reached was 20,000 Jews and 5,000 Gypsies sent to Łódź, with tens of thousands sent to other ghettos. In November that year, to assuage Uebelhoer's qualms about ghetto arson started by Gypsies, Reichsführer-SS Heinrich Himmler advised Uebelhoer to shoot ten Gypsies for every fire that broke out within the ghetto. Those Gypsies who did not perish in the Łódź Ghetto were killed by gas vans in January 1942 in Chełmno.

Uebelhoer was dismissed from his post as district president of Łódź in December 1942 after being accused of embezzlement by Reichsstatthalter Arthur Greiser. The charges were ultimately unproven, but the suspicion damaged his reputation and halted his advancement in the SS. In October 1943, he was appointed Regierungspräsident of the Merseburg district.

Uebelhoer disappeared in the latter days of the Second World War and remained unaccounted for. He was legally declared dead in 1950.

== Sources ==
- Gerwarth, Robert (2011). Hitler's Hangman: The Life of Heydrich. New Haven, CT: Yale University Press. ISBN 978-0---300-11575-8.
- Klee, Ernst (2007). Das Personenlexikon zum Dritten Reich. Wer war was vor und nach 1945. Frankfurt-am-Main: Fischer-Taschenbuch-Verlag. ISBN 978-3-596-16048-8.
- Longerich, Peter (2012). Heinrich Himmler: A Life. Oxford; New York: Oxford University Press. ISBN 978-0-19-959232-6.
- Stockhorst, Erich (1985). 5000 Köpfe: Wer War Was im 3. Reich. Arndt. ISBN 978-3-887-41116-9.
