= Lucjan Dobroszycki =

Polish scientist and historian

Lucjan Dobroszycki (Yiddish: לוציאַן דאָבראָשיצקי; January 15, 1925 – October 24, 1995, in New York City) was a Polish scientist and historian specializing in modern Polish and Polish-Jewish history. A survivor of the Łódź Ghetto and Nazi concentration camps including Auschwitz, Dobroszycki lived in Poland after World War II where he obtained his education and worked as a historian. His main focus was the Nazi German occupation of Poland.

Dobroszycki undertook studies of the – legal and illegal – Polish press from during the war, edited an abridged version of the chronicle of the Łódź Ghetto (Litzmannstadt Ghetto), and conducted research on the extermination of Polish Jewry. He was a visiting scholar in Jerusalem in June 1967 and emigrated to the United States in 1970. He and his family settled in New York City where, for the remainder of his life he was a member of the research staff of the YIVO Institute for Jewish Research. He was also affiliated with Yeshiva University's Holocaust studies program.

According to Zachary Baker from Stanford, Dobroszycki became YIVO's "'research consultant to the stars'; he compiled a history of former New York mayor Ed Koch's ancestors and was a consultant to Barbra Streisand's film production of "Yentl" (an indirect Yiddish connection). His name has appeared in numerous published acknowledgments and documentary film credits."

== Early life and family ==
Dobroszycki was born in Łódź to Fiszel and Gitla (Minska) Dobroszycki. He married Felicja Herszkowicz and had one child, Joanna.

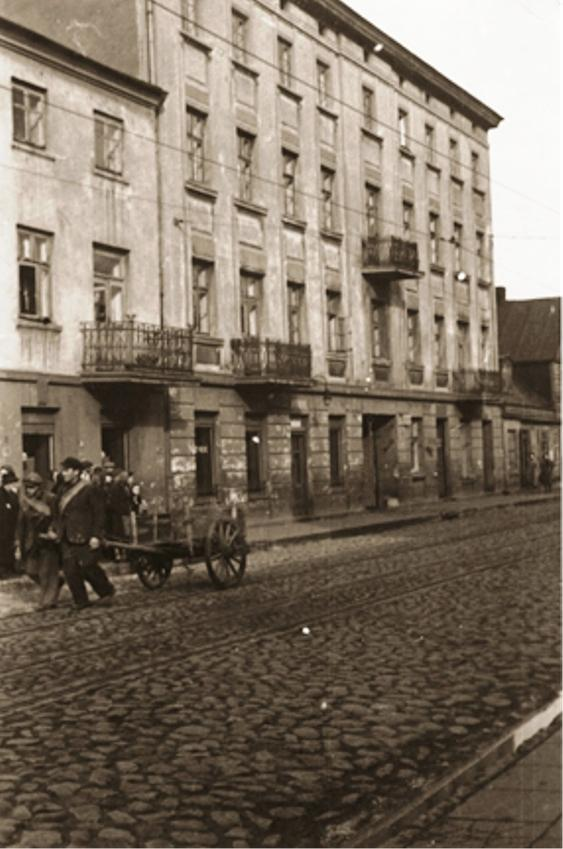
Men haul a cart down the street in the ghetto

== The Chronicle of the Lodz Ghetto ==
One of Dobroszycki's crowning achievements as a historian was the publication of the collected accounts of Jewish life under the Nazi occupation of Łódź, a day-to-day record of life in the second-largest Jewish ghetto in Nazi Europe. Only two of five projected volumes were published before Dr. Dobroszycki moved to New York in 1970. The first English translation of "The Chronicle of the Lodz Ghetto" was published by Yale University Press in 1984. In his review, Stefan Kanfer of Time.com reflected on the collected accounts:

"Within the barbed-wire boundaries a microcosm arose... Children were born, stores were opened, a road constructed, hospitals set up, administrators employed, records kept. It is these records, miraculously preserved in private libraries and underground caches, that provide the first detailed portrait of a Holocaust society. In The Chronicle of the Lodz Ghetto, Editor Lucjan Dobroszycki, a survivor, presents an eerie and horrific scene told in terse entries, like a nightmare dreamed in pieces."

== Polish award ==
Lucjan Dobroszycki was posthumously awarded Polityka magazine's Historical Award for the year 2006, on the 50th anniversary of its inauguration.

== Works ==
- Image Before My Eyes A Photographic History of Jewish Life in Poland 1864–1939 with Barbara Kirshenblatt-Gimblett (Hardcover, 1977) ISBN 0-8052-3607-4
- Image Before My Eyes: A Photographic History of Jewish Life in Poland, 1864-1939 with Barbara Kirshenblatt-Gimblett (Paperback, Sep 13, 1987. Other Editions: Hardcover) ISBN 0-8052-0634-5
- Image Before My Eyes: A Photographic History of Jewish Life in Poland Before the Holocaust with Barbara Kirshenblatt-Gimblett (Paperback, Nov 1, 1994) ISBN 0-8052-1026-1
- The Chronicle of the Lodz Ghetto, 1941-1944 (Abridged edition, hardcover, 1984) ISBN 0-300-03208-0; (Paperback, 1987) ISBN 0-300-03924-7
- The Jews in Polish Culture (Jewish Lives) by Aleksander Hertz, Czesław Miłosz, Lucjan Dobroszycki, and Richard Lourie (Paperback, Aug 1, 1988. Other Editions: Hardcover) ISBN 0-8101-0758-9
- Reptile Journalism: The Official Polish-Language Press under the Nazis, 1939-1945 with Barbara Harshav (Hardcover, Dec 28, 1994) ISBN 0-300-05277-4
- Hanukkah Lights: Stories from the Festival of Lights by Rebecca Goldstein, Harlan Ellison, Daniel Mark Epstein, and Lucjan Dobroszycki (Audio Cassette, Nov 9, 2001. Unabridged. Other Editions: Audio Cassette, Audio Download) ISBN 1-57453-459-9
- The Chronicle of the Lodz Ghetto, 1941-1944 (Paperback, 1984)
- The Holocaust in the Soviet Union: Studies and Sources on the Destruction of the Jews in the Nazi-Occupied Territories of the USSR, 1941-1945 with Jeffrey S. Gurock (Hardcover, Aug 1993. Other Editions: Paperback) ISBN 1-56324-173-0
- Reptile Journalism: The Official Polish-Language Press under the Nazis (Hardcover, 1994)
- Survivors of the Holocaust in Poland: A Portrait Based on Jewish Community Records 1944-1947 (Hardcover, Nov 1994) ISBN 1-56324-463-2
- Survivors of the Holocaust in Poland; A Portrait (Hardcover, 1994)
- Ludność cywilna w Powstaniu Warszawskim, vol. 3. in Prasa, druki ulotne i inne publikacje powstańcze. Editors: Czesław Madajczyk, Władysław Bartoszewski, Lucjan Dobroszycki, intro by W. Bartoszewski, Warszawa 1977.
- Prasa, druki ulotne i inne publikacje powstancze by Czeslaw Madajczyk. Editors: Wladyslaw Bartoszewski and Lucjan Dobroszycki; Panstwowy Instytut Wydawniczy, 1974, E.Eur**P*866**3(128141375W)
- Centralny katalog polskiej prasy konspiracyjnej, 1939-1945. Editors: Lucjan Dobroszycki, Wanda Kiedrzynska, Stanislaw Ploski. Warszawa: Wydawnictwo Ministerstwa Obrony Narodowej, 1962. Eur**P*156**(128140657Y)

== See also ==
- History of Jews in Poland
- Chronology of Jewish Polish history
- World War II atrocities in Poland
