= Kamila Szczawińska =

Polish model

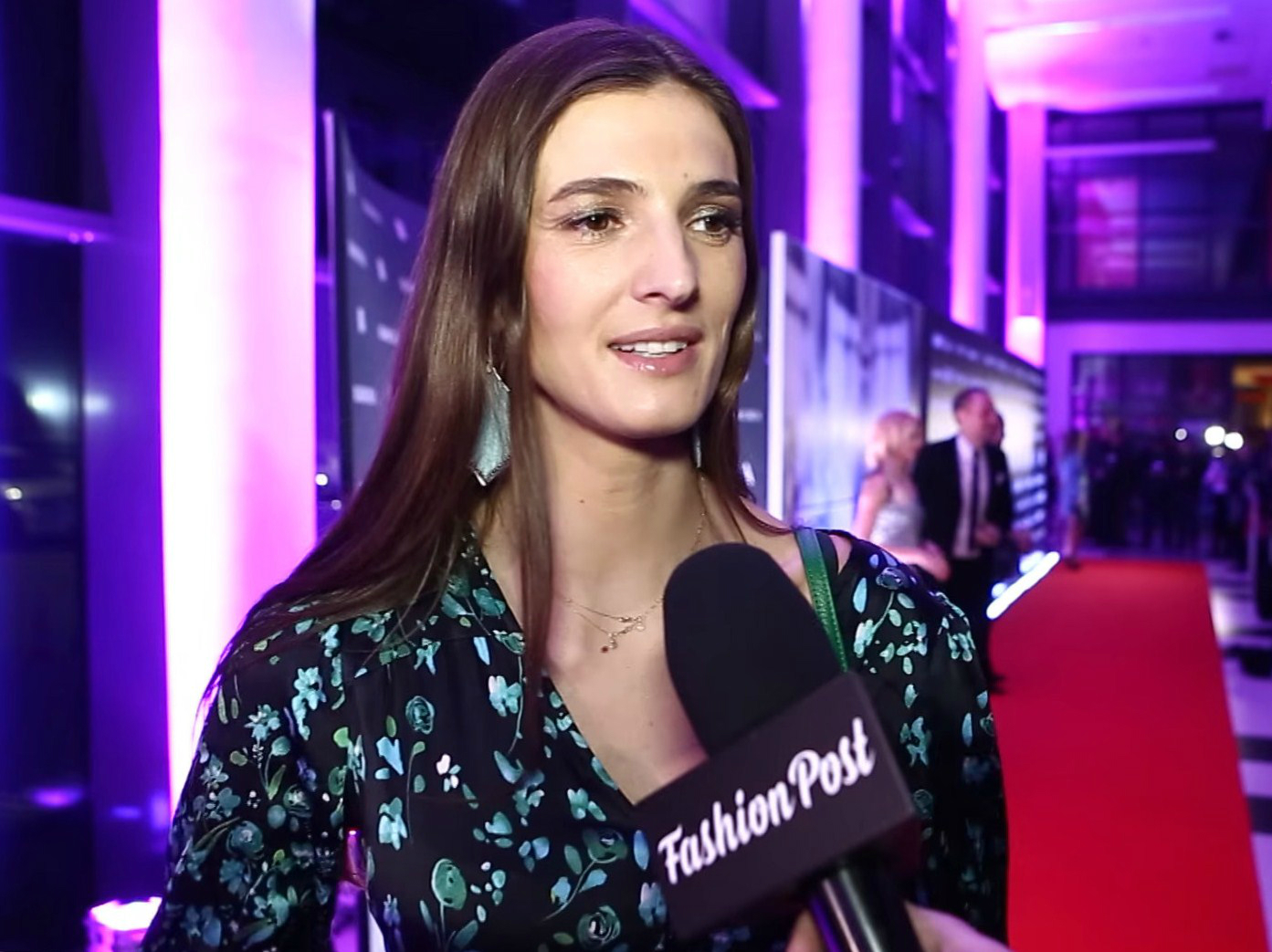
- Born: 20 September 1984 (age 41); Poznań, Poland
- Modelling information
- Height: 1.78 m (5 ft 10 in)
- Hair colour: Brown
- Eye colour: Brown
- Agency: Model Plus: Warsaw; Fashion Model Management: Milan; Next: Paris, New York City

Kamila Szczawińska (born 20 September 1984, in Poznań) is a Polish model.

== Biography ==
=== Early years ===
She spent part of her life in Rożnowice and Jaracz. She graduated from a primary school in Parkowo.

=== Career ===
She started her work in modelling in 2001 for one of the modelling agencies in Poznań. Initially, she appeared at fashion shows in Poznań's Okrąglak and the Poznań Fashion Fair. During one of the shows in Poznań, Kamila was spotted by an agent of one of the Milan agencies and persuaded her to leave. There, she was quickly involved in shows of famous creators such as: Valentino, Giorgio Armani and Gucci. Later, she signed another contract in Paris, where she worked for brands such as: Chanel, Yves Saint Laurent, Christian Dior and Gucci. Then she found herself in New York City, where she promoted fashion houses, including: Emanuel Ungaro, Marc Jacobs, Ralph Lauren, Sonia Rykiel, Rocco Barocco, Viktor & Rolf, Christian Lacroix, Elie Saab, John Galliano and Kenzo. She was the muse of Roberto Cavallego. In 2007, she appeared for the last time on the world catwalk in a Stella McCartney show.

From 2007 to 2013, she suspended international careers for her family life. During this time, she sporadically participated in shows of Polish fashion designers, such as: Dawid Woliński and Małgorzata Baczyńska. From 2014, she began to appear again on European catwalks. She signed a renewed contract with an agency in Milan. She has already had fashion shows for the brands Deni Cler, Klif and La Mania. From 6 to 27 March, 2015, she participated in the third edition of the programme Dancing with the Stars: Taniec z gwiazdami broadcast by Polsat. Her dance partner was Robert Kochanek, with whom she dropped out in the fourth episode, taking ninth place. From 23 February to 8 March 2016, she participated in the programme Agent – Gwiazdy on TVN. She later disappeared in the third episode.

On 23 November 2016, she released her cookbook entitled Kuchnia dla całej rodziny (Kitchen for the whole family), which was published by Edipresse Books.

=== Private life ===
On 13 June 2009, she got married. She has two children, son Julek and daughter Kalina. Update: She now has three children (per her interview on Radio Nowy Świat in 2024).
