= Stare =

Stare may refer to:

== Places ==
- Staré, a village and municipality in Michalovce District in the Kosice Region of eastern Slovakia
- Stare, Oborniki County in Greater Poland Voivodeship (west-central Poland)
- Stare, Piła County in Greater Poland Voivodeship (west-central Poland)
- Stare Selo, Sumy Oblast, village in Ukraine

== People ==
- Frederick J. Stare (1911–2002), American nutritionist
- Matej Stare (born 1978), Slovenian former racing cyclist
- Ragnar Stare (1884–1964), Swedish sport shooter
- Ward Stare (born 1982), American conductor

== Music ==
- Stare (indie band), an English band
- Stare (album) and its title track, by Gorky Park
- "Stare", song by Ty Dolla Sign Beach House 3

== See also ==
- Staring, a prolonged gaze or fixed look
