= Romualdas Marcinkus =

Lithuanian pilot and footballer

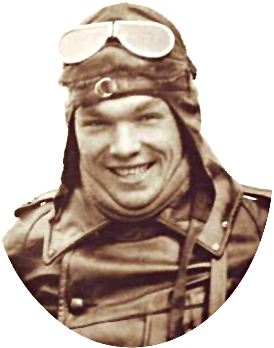
- Romualdas Marcinkus
- Born: 22 July 1907; Jurbarkas, Kovno Governorate, Russian Empire
- Died: 29 March 1944 (aged 36) forest near Pruśce, Nazi Germany
- Military career
- Allegiance: Lithuania; France; United Kingdom
- Branch: Lithuanian Air Force; French Air Force; Royal Air Force
- Service years: 1926–1944
- Rank: Captain (Lithuania); Flight lieutenant (Britain)
- Conflicts: Second World War
- Awards: Order of the Lithuanian Grand Duke Gediminas Knight's Cross; Order of the White Lion Knight's Cross; Order of the Crown of Italy Knight's Cross; Steel Wings (Plieno sparnai); Mentioned in Despatches; 1939–45 Star; Air Crew Europe Star; War Medal 1939–1945

Romualdas Marcinkus (22 July 1907 – 29 March 1944) was a Lithuanian pilot. Marcinkus participated in an early trans-European flight on 25 June 1934, and was the only Lithuanian pilot to serve in the Royal Air Force (RAF) during the Second World War. In his youth Marcinkus was a Lithuanian multifold football champion and a playing coach for the Lithuania national football team.

While serving in the Lithuanian Air Force, Marcinkus was a parachute instructor, and headed the aviation sport and physical education department, and during his later years coached a junior football team. A few months before the Soviet occupation of Lithuania early in the Second World War, Marcinkus left Lithuania and enlisted in the French Air Force. After the Battle of France and the French capitulation, Marcinkus escaped to Britain, where he flew for the RAF. As a pilot for No. 1 Squadron RAF, he took part in various missions, including escorting bombers and night combat. On 12 February 1942, during Operation Cerberus, he was shot down, became a prisoner of war, and was sent to Stalag Luft III.

At Stalag Luft III Marcinkus became an active member of an underground group of prisoners who organized and executed the Great Escape. Marcinkus was responsible for analyzing the German railway schedules – a vital part of the plan. On the night of 25 March 1944, Marcinkus became one of 76 servicemen who escaped the prison camp. After several days he was recaptured by the Gestapo and executed.

At the end of the Second World War, Lithuania lost its independence and Marcinkus was largely forgotten. His memory was kept alive by the Lithuanian émigré press. After Lithuania regained its independence in 1990, more detailed accounts of his life were published there and abroad.

== Early life ==
Marcinkus was born on 22 July 1907 in the provincial Lithuanian town of Jurbarkas. At the time Jurbarkas, as well of the rest of Lithuania, was part of the Russian Empire. Romualdas' father, Pranas Marcinkus, served as a policeman in Jurbarkas, Tauragė, and Rumšiškės. His mother, Honorata Kroazė-Marcinkienė, came from an urban family of French origins. Marcinkus' cousin, Vanda Kroazė-Šestakauskienė, stated that the Kroazė family's origins in Lithuania began with a Frenchman named Courvoisier, who came to Lithuania with Napoleon's army during the French invasion of Russia in the 19th century and married a local Lithuanian woman.

Romualdas was the eldest of five children in the family. After his younger brother died during childhood he became the family's only son. Following the First World War, Lithuania successfully re-established its independence and the first gymnasium in Jurbarkas was established. Soon afterwards, Marcinkus attended the institution, and became passionate about sports, especially football. Romualdas, or Romas as his friends called him, played football for the local team. Marcinkus was known for his stamina and discipline among his peers.

== In Lithuanian army service ==
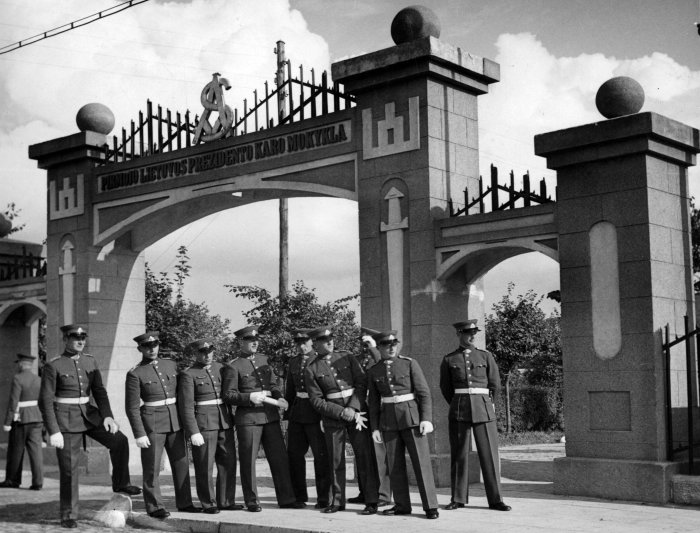
Gates of the Kaunas Military School. Marcinkus graduated from here in 1928

At age 17, Marcinkus moved from Jurbarkas to Kaunas, the temporary capital of Lithuania. In Kaunas, he attended the Higher German School. After graduating from the German School, he enrolled at the Kaunas Military School, intending to enlist in the Lithuanian army.

During this time the Lithuanian army was expanding and modernizing. The Lithuanian Air Force was especially targeted for rapid development and service in this branch was prestigious. Some of its earlier members such as Jurgis Dobkevičius and Antanas Gustaitis were instrumental in improving on aeronautical designs. While at the military school Marcinkus played for the KSK (Kauno sporto klubas) football club. After his father's death in 1927, Marcinkus took on the responsibility of supporting his remaining family, he also began playing football for LFLS Kaunas.

The aviator Steponas Darius, with associates, had established the Lietuvos Fizinio Lavinimo Sąjunga, which soon became one of the leading football clubs in Lithuania. Marcinkus joined the club and won a national championship during his first season. On 27 July 1927, Marcinkus played for Lithuania in an international match. Although they lost, Marcinkus managed to score his first goal in an international game. The Lithuanian team's coach predicted a bright future for Marcinkus in football. At that time football was among the most popular sports in Kaunas.

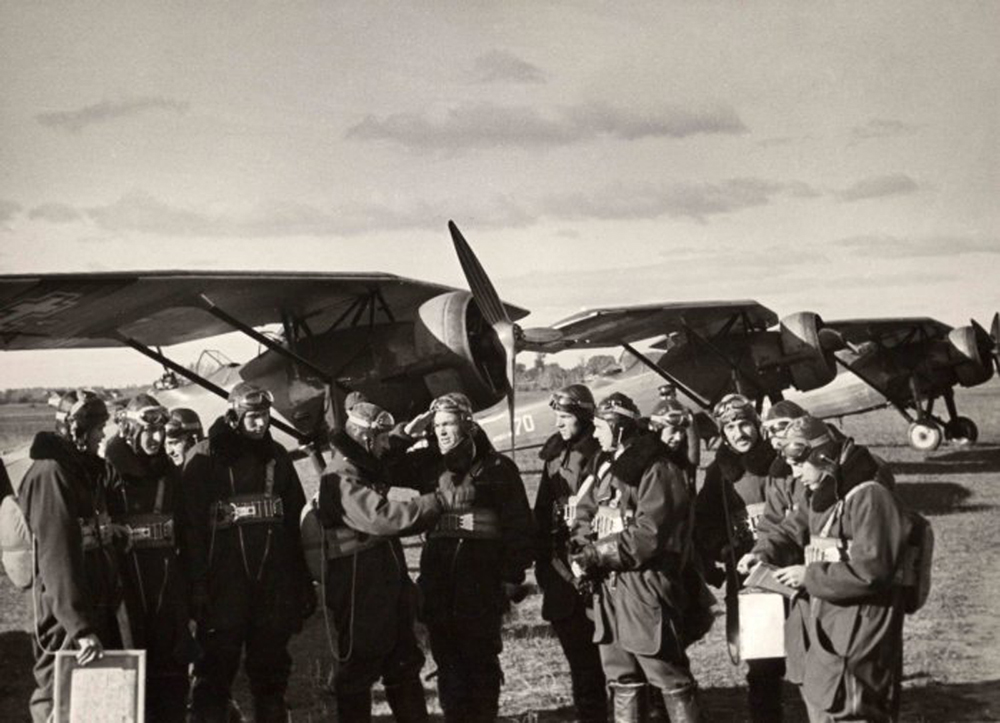
Marcinkus reporting after a flight

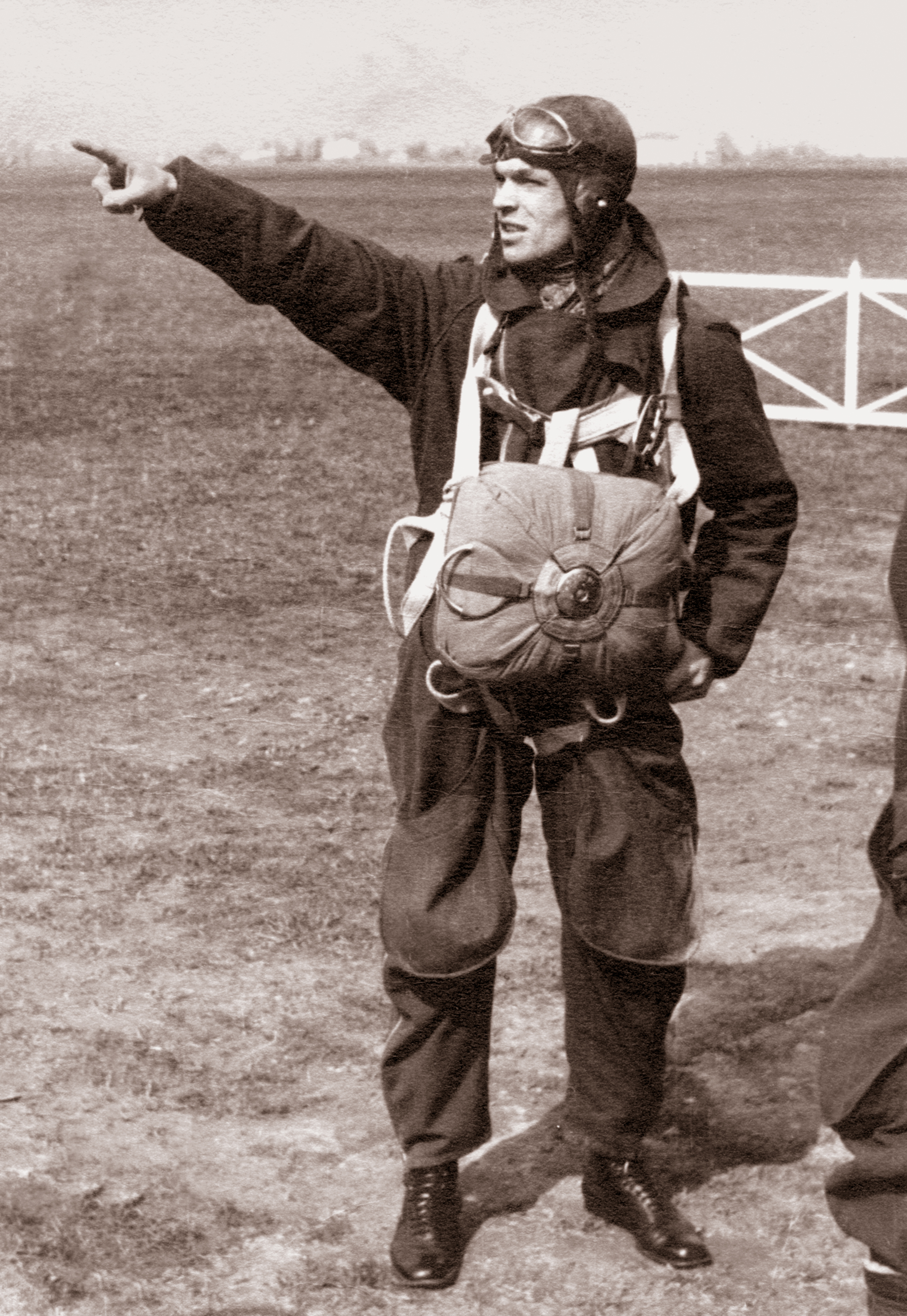
Marcinkus later became a parachute instructor in the Lithuanian Air Force

In 1928 Marcinkus graduated from the Kaunas Military School and received a commission as an infantry second lieutenant. From 1930 until 1932 he attended the Vytautas the Great Military Institute's aviation department and became a military pilot. While pursuing his military career, Marcinkus did not abandon his passion for football. He became a Lithuanian football champion three times. His team won the cup for the Baltic states' championship twice, and he played over forty games for the national team. Eventually, Marcinkus became a coach for the national team. He also wrote several articles about football and ethics in sports. His many successes made him a celebrity in his home county. He is considered one of the best Lithuanian players of that time.

In 1933, Marcinkus advanced to the rank of lieutenant, which was conferred by Lithuanian President, Antanas Smetona. In the same year he married Aleksandra Lingytė. Lingytė was also a prominent Lithuanian sportswoman; she won several basketball championships for Lithuania. Around the same time, inspired by Klemensas Martinkus, Marcinkus became a parachute instructor. Soon he became a parachuting master in the air force and participated in various air shows.

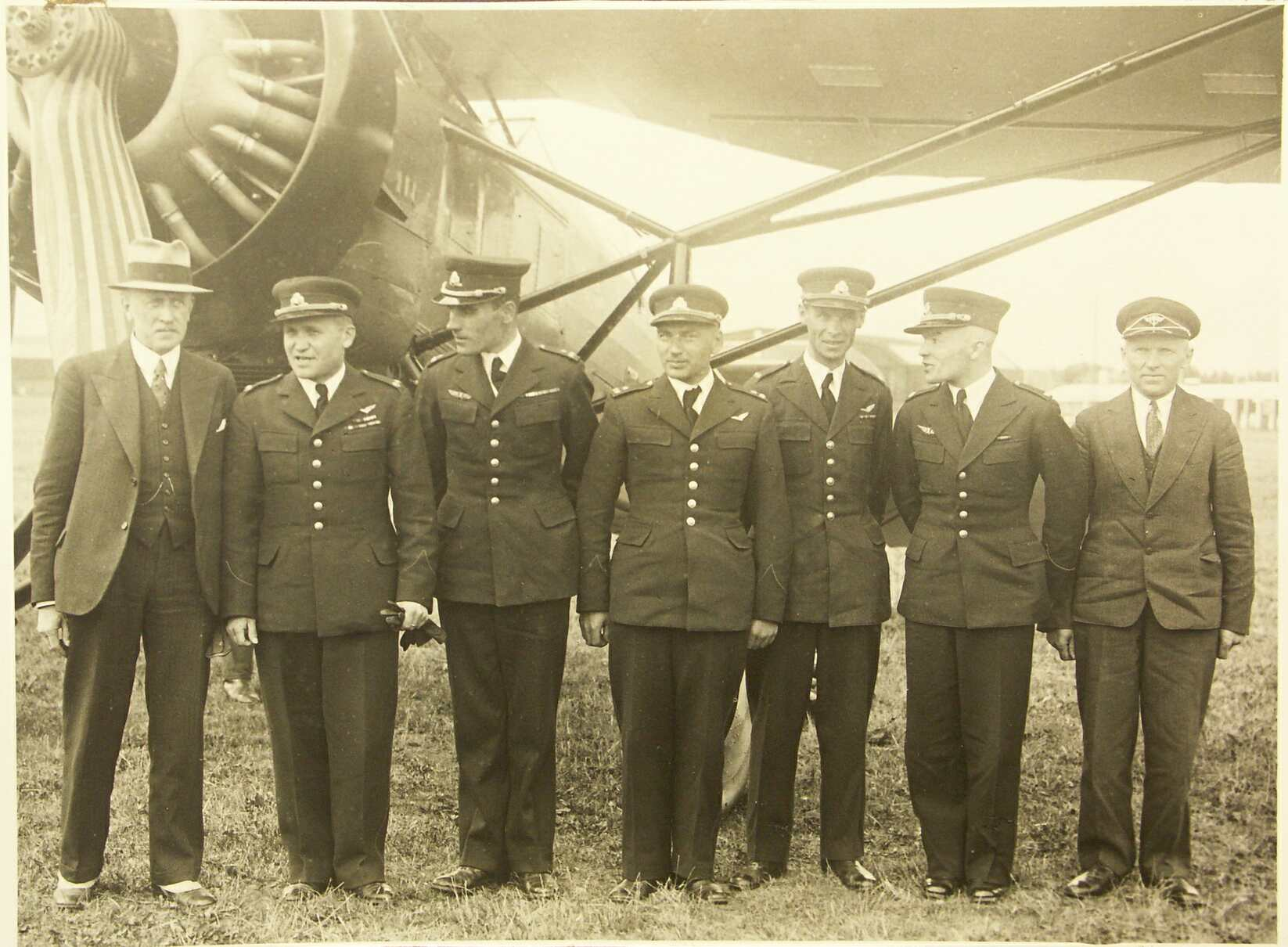
Crew of the trans-European flight (from left): Jurgis Savickis, Antanas Gustaitis, Jonas Liorentas, Juozas Namikas, Jonas Mikėnas, Romualdas Marcinkus, and Kazys Rimkevičius near an ANBO 41 plane.

In 1934 Marcinkus was transferred to the air reconnaissance department, there he started improving his expertise in independent flying, mapping, photography, and weapon systems. 1934 proved to be a challenging year for Marcinkus. Antanas Gustaitis, a prominent Lithuanian aircraft constructor and commander of Lithuanian Military Aviation, invited Marcinkus to participate in a trans-European flight, along with Jonas Liorentas, Juozas Namikas, Jonas Mikėnas, and Kazys Rimkevičius. After detailed planning and preparation, the trans-European flight was begun in the same year. During the 25 days of their flight, the pilots flew three of Gustaitis' designed aircraft, the ANBO IVs, over 10,000 kilometers and visited 12 European capitals. The Lithuanian pilots were warmly welcomed in the countries they visited. They were received by the British royal family and the Italian dictator Benito Mussolini.

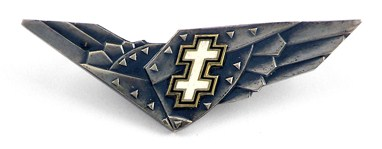
Steel Wings (Plieno sparnai), the highest award in Lithuanian military aviation. Marcinkus was decorated with the wings in 1939

Upon his return, Marcinkus was promoted to the rank of captain and decorated with the Order of the Lithuanian Grand Duke Gediminas Knight's Cross. He was also named head of the aviation physical education department. He went on to establish a junior football team and teach German. His superiors noted that Marcinkus seemed more interested in sports than in his military duties at that time. His sporting career ended in 1938, however, when he injured a knee and was forced to abandon football. Despite the fact that he was decorated with steel wings (plieno sparnai), the highest award in Lithuanian military aviation, the following year proved very trying on a personal level. He was burdened with debts and underwent a nervous breakdown. His military career was interrupted by a scandal and he was transferred to the reserves.

While the Winter War was gathering momentum, Marcinkus argued for supporting Finland, but Lithuania remained neutral during the conflict. Nevertheless, some Lithuanians left to fight alongside the Finns. In 1940 Marcinkus also left Lithuania, apparently intending to help Finland, although the war had ended by the time he arrived. Soon afterwards he traveled to France, then at war with Germany.

== In French air force service ==
Marcinkus arrived in France in mid-March 1940 and immediately requested acceptance into the French Air Force (Armee de l'Air). Bureaucratic delays hindered his enlistment. By the time these hurdles were cleared, the Battle for France was rapidly drawing to a close. It is possible, however, that Marcinkus succeeded in shooting down several German military planes during his short career in that air force.

After France surrendered, Marcinkus managed to make his way to the French colonies in Africa (Morocco and Algeria). He decided to go to Great Britain and continue fighting, but the French army's terms of armistice at Compiègne and tensions between Britain and France made this difficult. On 12 August 1940 he was finally demobilized from the French air force. Marcinkus and some of his associates concocted a daring plan to commandeer several aircraft without authorization and fly to England. The plan was not executed due to increased security at airfields and other circumstances. He finally received the necessary documents enabling him to go to Britain in autumn of 1940.

== In British service ==
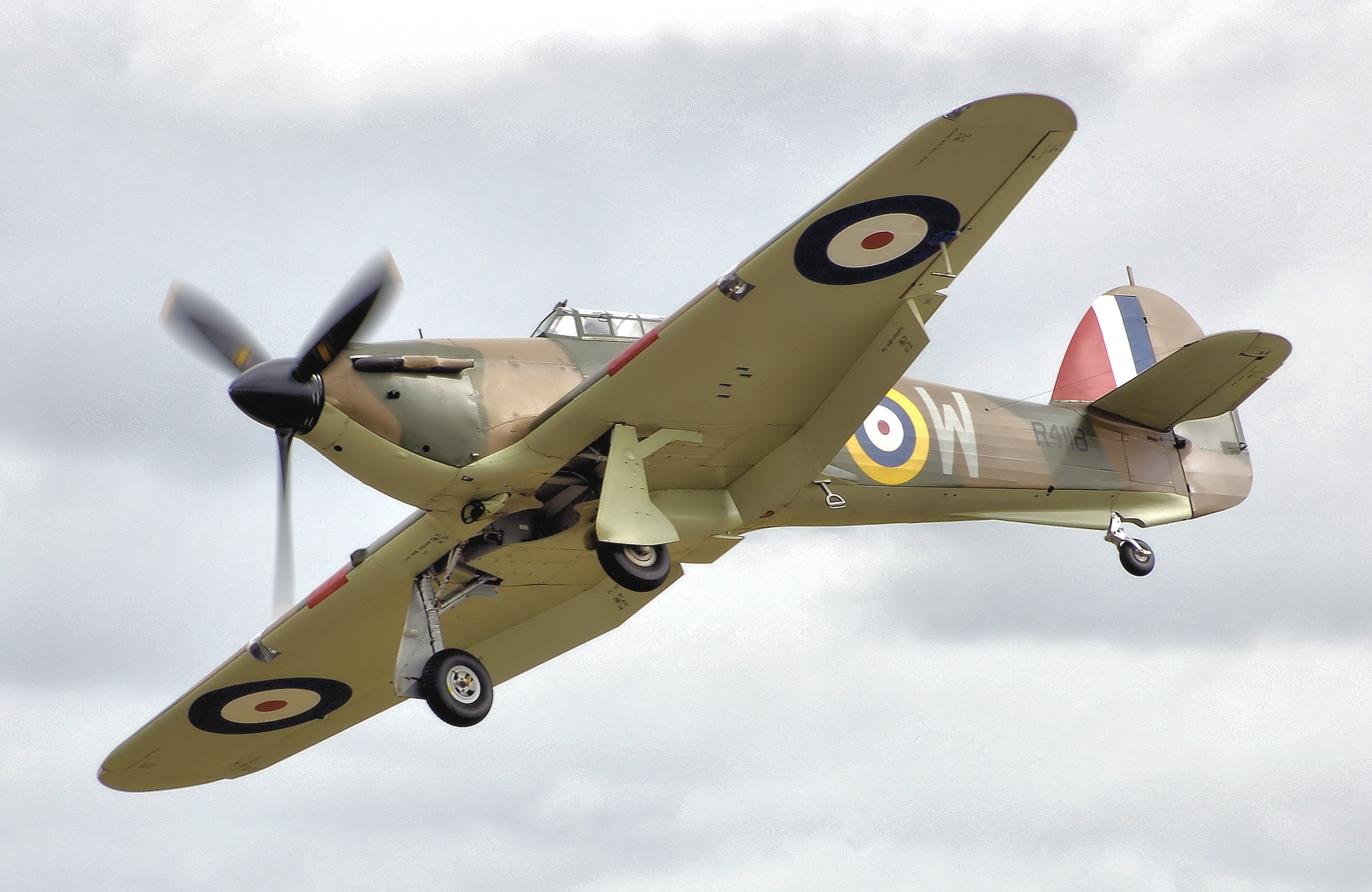
In the RAF Marcinkus flew the Hurricane fighter aircraft

In October 1940, Marcinkus reached Liverpool, and from there travelled on to London. On 24 December of the same year, Marcinkus became a pilot in the Royal Air Force (RAF). To achieve that, he changed some of his personal data; he stated that he was three years younger, otherwise he would have been too old for service in the RAF. At that time, his homeland Lithuania had already lost its independence to the Soviet Union, and the Lithuanian air force was rapidly liquidated by its occupiers. Throughout the years, Maricinkus maintained close contacts with the Lithuanian attaché in Britain in order to receive news about Lithuania and his family.

On 1 January 1941, Marcinkus was transferred to a training base. He demonstrated his flying skills, hoping to fly the British Hurricane fighter aircraft. He was successful and was transferred to No. 1 Squadron RAF, then stationed at Tangmere, Sussex. Marcinkus became the only Lithuanian pilot to fly for the RAF during the Second World War. Marcinkus wrote in his letter about the new challenges lying ahead:

I was transferred to the night fighters – at that time the most dangerous kind of military aviation. But I like danger – I faced danger during my entire life, in flying, sports, and personal life. With this I am satisfied, but...I am lacking warmth and the comfort of my personal life in this country of "cold slob weather and so called correctness".

In one of the Marcinkus's letters to the Lithuanian envoy, Bronius Kazys Balutis, he notes that he shot down his first German bomber, a Dornier Do 17 in March. Marcinkus also wrote that he was gathering skills and knowledge in order to make a contribution towards liberating Lithuania and restoring its independence.

In the RAF, Marcinkus carried out multiple tasks, including various training missions, night combat and bomber escort. In June, Marcinkus and his squadron members engaged in prolonged air combat with the Luftwaffe. As later reports confirm, the Germans lost four Bf 109 fighter aircraft, one of which was shot down by Marcinkus. The original report submitted by Marcinkus claiming one Bf 109 shot down on 21 June 1941 is held in The National Archives; he states that he fired two short bursts from his guns from 100 yards behind the German. Sergeant Blasil, also of 1 Squadron, witnessed the plane break up in the air. On the allied side, one American pilot was missing. The last mission Marcinkus carried out as an RAF pilot was on 12 February 1942.

On 11 February 1942, a German operation codenamed "Cerberus" had commenced, in which a German Kriegsmarine squadron consisting of Scharnhorst, Gneisenau and Prinz Eugen, supported by a number of smaller ships, attempted to sail to their home bases via the English Channel. Six fighters from No. 1 Squadron were tasked with intercepting German ships and attacking German torpedo boats. Marcinkus was among the pilots. On 12 February, while attacking the Scharnhorst, his plane was shot down by anti-aircraft fire and crashed into the sea. Romualdas Marcinkus suffered a spinal fracture and was rescued by Germans, subsequently becoming a prisoner of war. During the course of the battle, the British lost approximately forty planes and failed to prevent the German fleet from returning to Kiel and Wilhelmshaven.

== The Great Escape ==
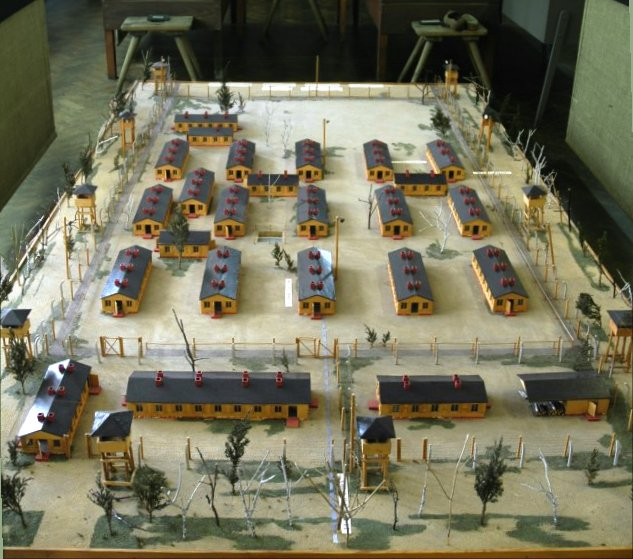
A model of Stalag Luft III, Marcinkus would spend two years there

Marcinkus was sent to Stalag Luft III, a prisoner-of-war camp near Sagan that housed captured air force servicemen during the Second World War. The camp was restructured several times in order to accommodate more POWs. It would eventually hold over 10,000 inmates. Marcinkus was the only known Lithuanian at the camp.

Squadron Leader Roger Bushell selected inmates and began planning an escape, at first focused on digging a tunnel. Already experienced from earlier escapes, Bushell became the nominal leader of this endeavour. The group expanded and accepted Marcinkus into their ranks—his fluent command of several languages, most importantly German, was seen as valuable.

The prisoners delegated various tasks amongst themselves in order to better implement their escape. Marcinkus began working on creating forged documents that would aid the escapees once they were out of the confines of the Stalag. He also contributed his intelligence to analyses of the Baltic and Low Countries. His extensive knowledge of Germany's military and transport positions led to his nickname as "Know-it-All." He analyzed German news reports, but his most important contribution was his compilation of the German railway schedules, an essential part of the escape plan. Bertram James remembered Marcinkus' contribution to the escape operation:

While I didn't know Marcinkus directly, but I remember him very well. I remember him as friendly guy, having a good character, he also had a phenomenal memory. He was especially good at memorizing numbers, dates, and after analyzing a pile of information, he made a precise compilation of the Reich's railway schedules. These schedules were used by men, who during the Great Escape traveled by train, including me...He was fluent in German, perhaps this allowed him to bribe or negotiate with German officials in order to get needed information, but I know for sure, that Marcinkus' analyzed vast amounts of information and became very useful during the Great Escape.

During March 1944, final preparations for the escape gathered momentum. In its original form about 200 prisoners were to escape. As cover stories, they were to pose as foreign workers from a number of countries. According to the plan, Marcinkus needed to be among the first escapees. He was selected to lead a group of four prisoners posing as Lithuanian workers traveling back to Lithuania. The group's prospects hinged on the hope that the Germans encountered on the way would not speak or understand Lithuanian, as Marcinkus was the only member fluent in that language.

On the night of 25 March, the prisoners enacted their plan. Serious problems arose immediately. The tunnel hatch proved difficult to open and the tunnel exit was several metres short of the relatively safe forested area. These problems led to delays and only 76 POWs managed to make their break for freedom. As originally intended, Marcinkus was one of the first ten to escape.

Marcinkus and the three prisoners in his group posing as Lithuanians – Tim Walenn, Henri Picard and Gordon Brettell – managed to reach a train heading towards Danzig (now Gdansk, Poland). Most likely, they intended to travel to East Prussia, cross the Lithuanian border, and somehow cross the Baltic Sea to neutral Sweden. However, officials at the Stalag had discovered the escape and began manhunts. Marcinkus and his group travelled further than most of the escapees, but were captured by the Gestapo near Schneidemühl on 26 March. Marcinkus and his associates were brought to Stalag XX-B and spent the night there. On the following day they were handed over to the Danzig Gestapo.

== Death ==
Officers of the Danzig Gestapo took Marcinkus to a forest at Gross Trampken (Trabki Wielkie) near Pruśce and executed him. On 29 March his body was cremated in Danzig's Gestapo crematorium.

The executions of the fifty recaptured servicemen were sanctioned by Adolf Hitler. Only three escapees managed to reach their final destinations. The Gestapo claimed that the recaptured servicemen were shot after resisting arrest and while attempting to escape again. By the time of his death Marcinkus held the rank of flight lieutenant in the Royal Air Force Volunteer Reserve.

== Commemoration ==
Memorial to "The Fifty" near Stalag Luft III; Romualdas Marcinkus is listed on the right

Details of the Great Escape executions reached the British Government. Its Foreign Secretary, Anthony Eden, then delivered this speech to the House of Commons:

His Majesty's Government must, therefore, record their solemn protest against these cold-blooded acts of butchery. They will never cease in their efforts to collect the evidence to identify all those responsible. They are firmly resolved that these foul criminals shall be tracked down to the last man wherever they may take refuge. When the war is over they will be brought to exemplary justice.

The remaining inmates at Stalag Luft III erected a memorial to their fifty executed comrades at the end of 1944. Following the war, the Allies launched an investigation into the escaped prisoners' executions and named seventy-two individuals as responsible. Marcinkus' killer was convicted in 1948. In the same year Marcinkus' burial place was identified and an urn containing his ashes was transferred to the British section of the Old Garrison Cemetery in Poznań, his grave is marked by a Commonwealth War Graves Commission headstone.

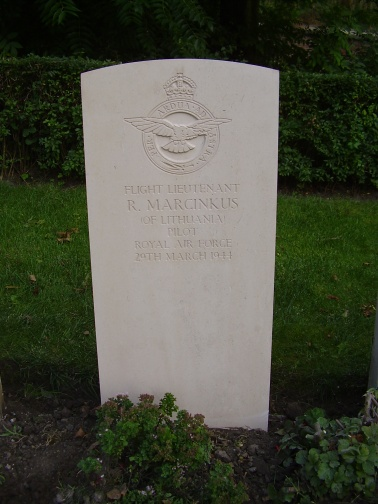
Marcinkus' ashes rest in a grave at Poznań, marked by a Commonwealth War Graves Commission headstone.

Marcinkus was posthumously mentioned in despatches in the 1944 King's Birthday Honours, he also received the 1939–45 Star, the Air Crew Europe Star, and the War Medal 1939–1945. British authorities attempted to contact his relatives in Lithuania, but Lithuania—as a Soviet Socialist Republic— was behind the Iron Curtain, and they were advised to stop these attempts since his relatives might suffer negative consequences. At the time Soviet authorities saw those people who maintained contacts with the West as untrustworthy.

Marcinkus was seldom mentioned during the Cold War and his pre-war biography was only reprinted in the Lithuanian émigré press, particularly in the US. During the 1950s articles about Marcinkus began to appear in these newspapers, including Karys, Vienas iš daugelio (1950), Paskutinis žuvusiojo lakūno atvirukas (1955), and Kapitono Marcinkaus mirtis nelaisvėje (1956). The first significant publication discussing Marcinkus in Soviet Lithuania appeared in a 1967 issue of the journal Švytūrys. Thereinafter Marcinkus's life was more frequently mentioned, although much of the information presented was inaccurate and incomplete.

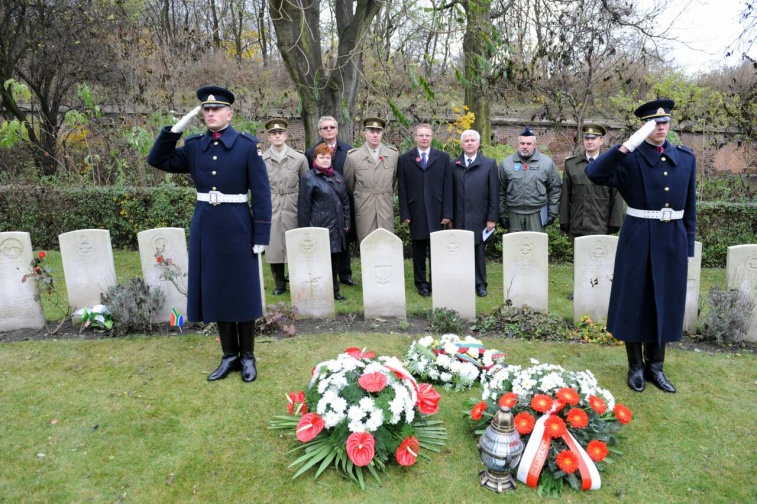
Honorary ceremony near Marcinkus' grave in Poznań, 2009

After Lithuania successfully re-established its independence, interest in his story gained momentum in Lithuania and elsewhere. In Jurbarkas, a street was named after him. The Lithuanian Air Force now sponsors the Marcinkus Pistol Marksmanship Cup. In 2001 the British Ambassador in Vilnius gave Marcinkus' previously unclaimed war medals to a surviving relative, his nephew, Alvydas Gabėnas, during a commemorative ceremony. The RAF provided a fly-past of Harrier jets from Marcinkus' No. 1 Squadron RAF, in which one aircraft saluted the ceremony. In the same year a plaque was dedicated to honour the famous Lithuanian pilot in Kaunas. Gražina Sviderskytė, a CNN award-winning journalist, wrote a detailed account of Marcinkus' life in her book Uragano kapitonas ("Hurricane Captain"), which was published in 2004. A documentary film with the same title was produced in 2004. Marcinkus' life story was reprinted in various foreign publications in the US, Canada, and Japan.
