= Wełna =

Wełna may refer to:

- Wełna (river), a river in west-central Poland
- Wełna, Greater Poland Voivodeship, a village in west-central Poland
- Wełna, Kuyavian-Pomeranian Voivodeship, a village in central Poland
