= Tim Walenn =

Royal Air Force officer

Gilbert William ("Tim") Walenn
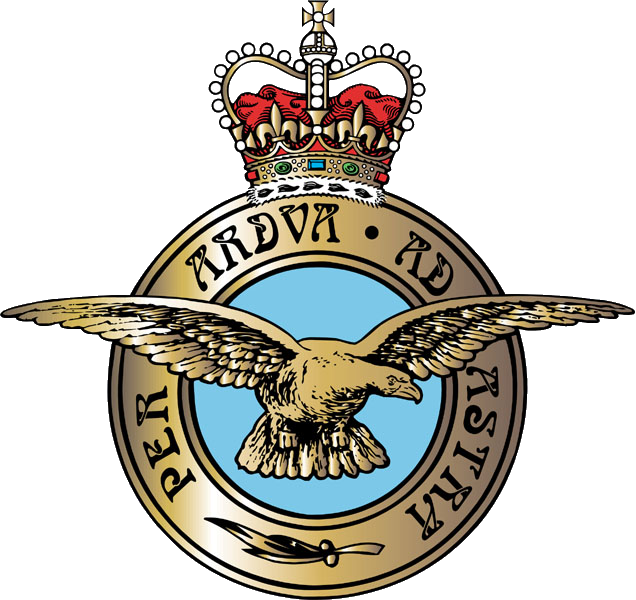
- Born: Gilbert William Walenn; 24 February 1916; Hendon, London
- Died: 29 March 1944 (aged 28); Pruśce near Danzig
- Burial place: Poznań Old Garrison Cemetery, Poland
- Military career
- Allegiance: United Kingdom
- Branch: Royal Air Force
- Service years: 1939–1944
- Rank: Flight lieutenant
- Nickname: Tim
- Unit: 25 (Bomber) Operational Training Unit
- Conflicts: World War II: Channel Front (POW)
- Awards: Mentioned in despatches

Gilbert William Walenn (24 February 1916 – 29 March 1944), known as Tim Walenn, was a British bomber pilot who was taken prisoner during the Second World War. He took part in the "Great Escape" from Stalag Luft III in March 1944, but was re-captured and subsequently shot by the Gestapo.

== Prewar ==
Walenn was born in Hendon, north-west London. He inherited a love of flight from his father, who had served with the Royal Flying Corps in the First World War, and drew aircraft as a child. After school, he joined his uncle's Silver Studio which produced designs for wallpaper and fabric. Walenn became a bank clerk with the Midland Bank in the hope of earning enough to pay for flying lessons and was a founder member of the Midland Bank Flying Club.

Walenn had connections to the East Finchley and Golders Green areas when he enlisted in the Royal Air Force Volunteer Reserve in 1937 as a trainee pilot. Walenn was commissioned as pilot officer on 1 September 1939, and joined No. 97 Squadron RAF as a bomber pilot.

== Wartime service ==
Walenn was confirmed as pilot officer on 29 June 1940 and quickly being promoted to flying officer on 10 September. He was a flying instructor at No. 10 Elementary Flying Training School for a year until August 1941, when he joined No. 25 Operational Training Unit where he would be involved in "ops" (operational missions). He was promoted to flight lieutenant on 10 September 1941.

=== Prisoner of war ===
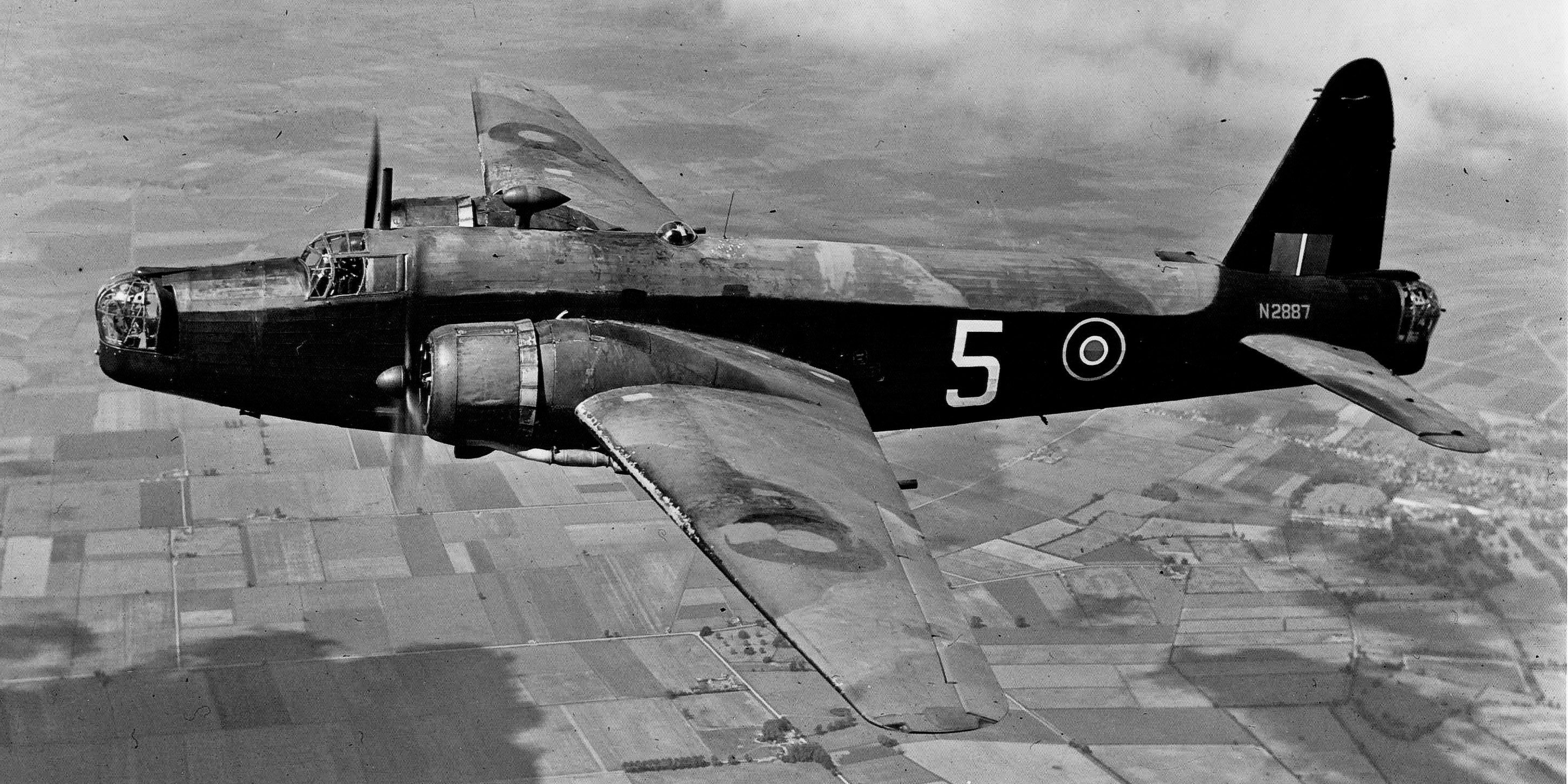
Wellington bomber

Serving with B Flight of No. 25 Operational Training Unit, Walenn took off in a Wellington Mark Ic bomber (serial number N2805) from RAF Finningley at 1955 hours on the night of 10 September 1941 to bomb the Misson ranges. At 0531 hours on the morning of 11 September, the bomber was hit by anti-aircraft fire and had to be abandoned. It crashed in Rotterdam's Ijsselhaven. The entire crew of five bailed out safely. Walenn was captured and sent to Stalag Luft III in the province of Lower Silesia near the town of Sagan (now Żagań in Poland). He became a well-known character in the prison camp system for his skilful drawing, as well as for his enormous handlebar moustache which had to be shaved off for the escape due to its unmistakable RAF style.

=== "Great Escape" ===
For the Great Escape operation, he used his artistic ability as head of forgery. His team (including fellow artist Ley Kenyon) produced forged passports, movement orders, railway documentation and all manner of identity papers to move about Germany. Walenn was one of the 76 men who escaped the prison camp on the night of 24–25 March 1944, in the escape now famous as "the Great Escape".

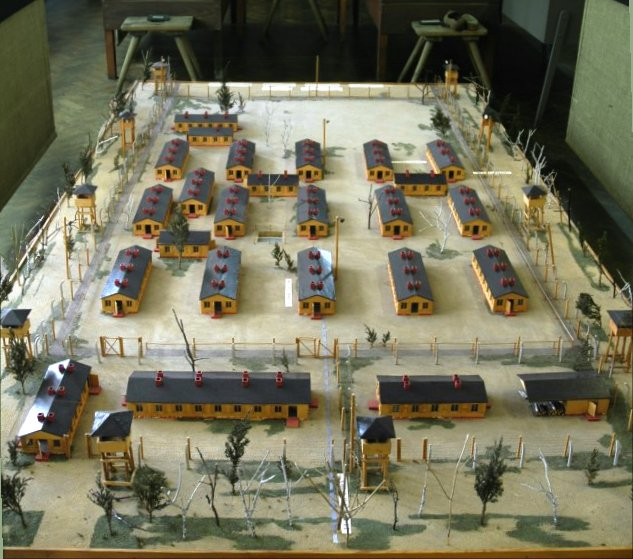
Model of Stalag Luft III prison camp

Travelling in a group of four escapees with Gordon Brettell, Romualdas Marcinkus and Henri Picard, all posing as French and Lithuanian workers, they managed to reach a train heading towards Danzig (now Gdańsk, Poland). Most likely, they intended to travel to East Prussia and cross the Lithuanian border hoping to cross the Baltic Sea to neutral Sweden. When the Germans discovered the escape, they began manhunts. Walenn and his group travelled further than most of the escapees but were captured by the Gestapo east of Schneidemühl somewhere close to Dirschau (now Tczew) on 26 March. The four were taken to Stalag XX-B and spent the night there, their presence being carefully recorded by the camp sergeant-major, who issued them with clothing more suited to prisoners of war in the hope of avoiding the possibility of them being charged with espionage. On the following day, they were handed over to the Danzig Gestapo. Its officials took the men to a forest near Gross Trampken (Trąbki Wielkie) and executed them. On 29 March, Walenn's body was cremated in Danzig's crematorium. He was originally buried at Sagan but is now buried in part of the Poznan Old Garrison Cemetery. Walenn's headstone has the inscription chosen by his parents: "In proud memory of our gallant and beloved son".

Memorial to "The Fifty" down the road toward Żagań (Walenn at centre)

He was one of the 50 escapees executed by the Gestapo for the escape. Walenn's name was amongst those in the list of the murdered prisoners which was published when news broke on or about 20 May 1944. Almost all of the nationalities involved in the escape were represented in the 50. Post-war investigations saw a number of those guilty of the murders tracked down, arrested and tried for their crimes.

== Awards ==
His conspicuous bravery was recognised by a mention in despatches, as none of the other relevant decorations then available could be awarded posthumously. It was published in a supplement to the London Gazette on 8 June 1944.
