= Rogoźno =

Town in Greater Poland Voivodeship, Poland

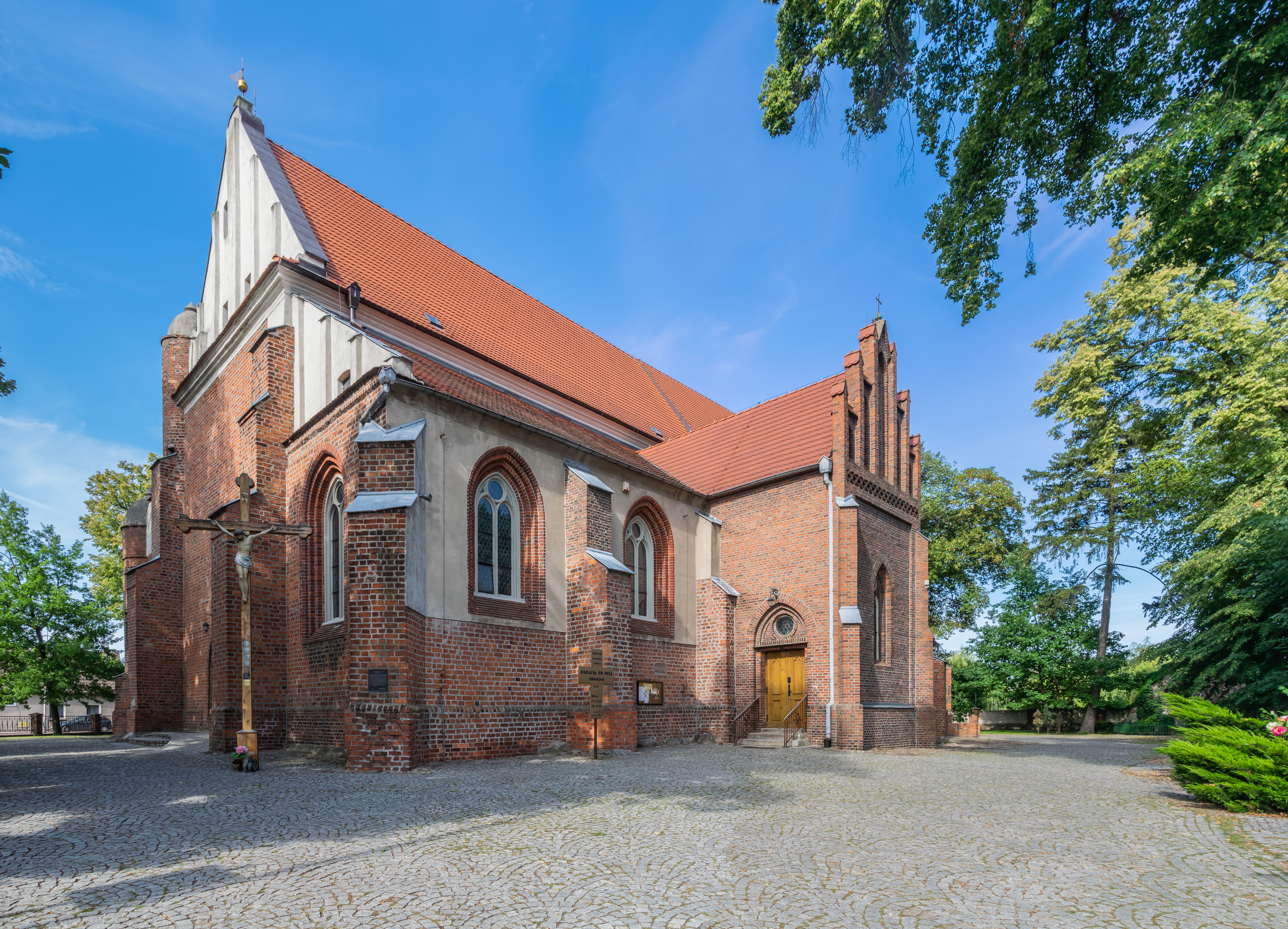
- Saint Vitus Church in Rogoźno

- Flag Coat of arms

- Location within Poland
- Coordinates: 52°44′57″N 16°59′59″E
- Country: Poland
- Voivodeship: Greater Poland
- County: Oborniki
- Gmina: Rogoźno
- First mentioned: 1192
- Town rights: 1280

Area
  - Total: 11.24 km^{2} (4.34 sq mi)
- Elevation: 63 m (207 ft)

Population (2021)
  - Total: 10,959
  - Density: 975.0/km^{2} (2,525/sq mi)
- Time zone: UTC+1 (CET)
  - Summer (DST): UTC+2 (CEST)
- Postal code: 64-610
- Vehicle registration: POB
- Website: http://www.rogozno.pl/

Rogoźno ([rɔˈɡɔʑnɔ], German: Rogasen) is a town in west-central Poland, in Greater Poland Voivodeship, about 40 kilometres (25 mi) north of Poznań. Its population is 10,959 (2021). It is the seat of the administrative district (gmina) called Gmina Rogoźno.

== History ==
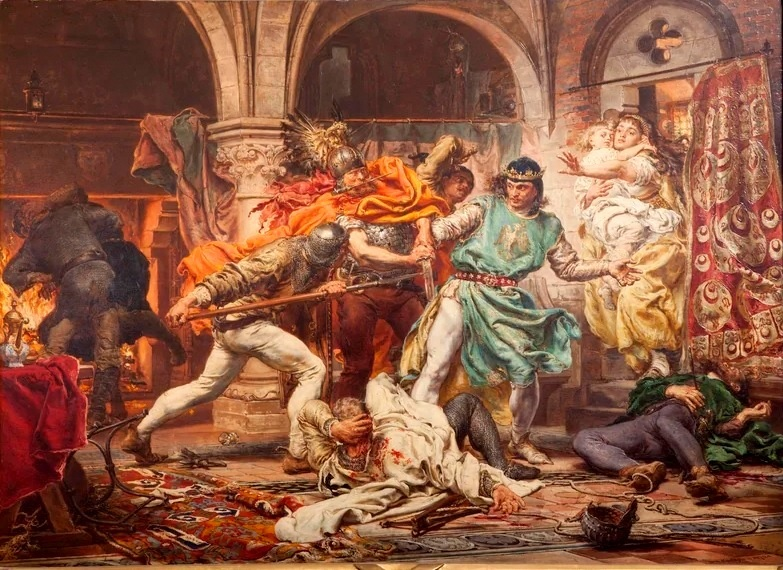
Death of King Przemysł II in Rogoźno, 19th-century painting by Jan Matejko

Rogoźno dates back to a Lechitic (proto-Polish) stronghold from the 8th and 9th centuries. Its name is of Old Polish origin, and comes from the word rogoża, a type of plant. The oldest known mention comes from 1192. From the mid-12th century it was a seat of a castellan. In 1280 it was granted town rights by Przemysł II. King Przemysł II of Poland was murdered in or near Rogoźno in 1296. According to one tradition he was kidnapped while staying at the town, but was so badly wounded in the process that he was unable to continue the journey, and was killed by his captors at Sierniki a few miles to the east. Rogoźno was a royal town of Poland, administratively located in the Poznań County in the Poznań Voivodeship in the Greater Poland Province.

The town was annexed by Prussia in the Second Partition of Poland in 1793. After the successful Greater Poland uprising of 1806, it was regained by Poles and included within the short-lived Duchy of Warsaw. The 10th Polish Infantry Regiment was formed in Rogoźno in 1806. In 1815 it was reannexed by Prussia, and from 1871 it was also part of Germany. During the time of Prussian administration, the town was subjected to Germanisation policies. In 1906–1907, local Polish school children protested against Germanisation. According to the 1910 census, the population of the town was 5,624, of whom 3,203 (57%) reported German as their sole mother tongue, while 2,326 (41%) reported Polish; the Jewish population was 515 (9%).

In November 1918, Poland regained independence and the Greater Poland uprising (1918–19) broke out, which goal was to reintegrate the town and region with the reborn state. The town was captured by Polish insurgents on December 31, 1918, and thereafter became part of the Second Polish Republic.

During the joint German-Soviet invasion of Poland in September 1939, which started World War II, the town was invaded by Germany and then occupied until 1945. Polish residents were subjected to arrests, massacres and expulsions. Some inhabitants of Rogoźno were among Poles massacred by the Germans in September 1939 in the nearby villages of Podlesie Kościelne and Międzylesie. In late 1939, around 900 Poles were expelled from the town and its surroundings. The Germans also established and operated a Nazi prison in the town. Nine graduates from the local teachers' college, as well as a local doctor and a police officer were murdered by the Russians in the Katyn massacre in 1940. The Polish resistance was active in Rogoźno. Local Polish scouts reproduced a secret Polish newspaper, originally published in nearby Oborniki.

== Demographics ==
Historical population

Year	Pop.	±%
1910	5,624	—
1921	5,528	−1.7%
1931	6,040	+9.3%
1939	6,348	+5.1%

Year	Pop.	±%
1950	5,867	−7.6%
1960	7,395	+26.0%
2010	11,158	+50.9%

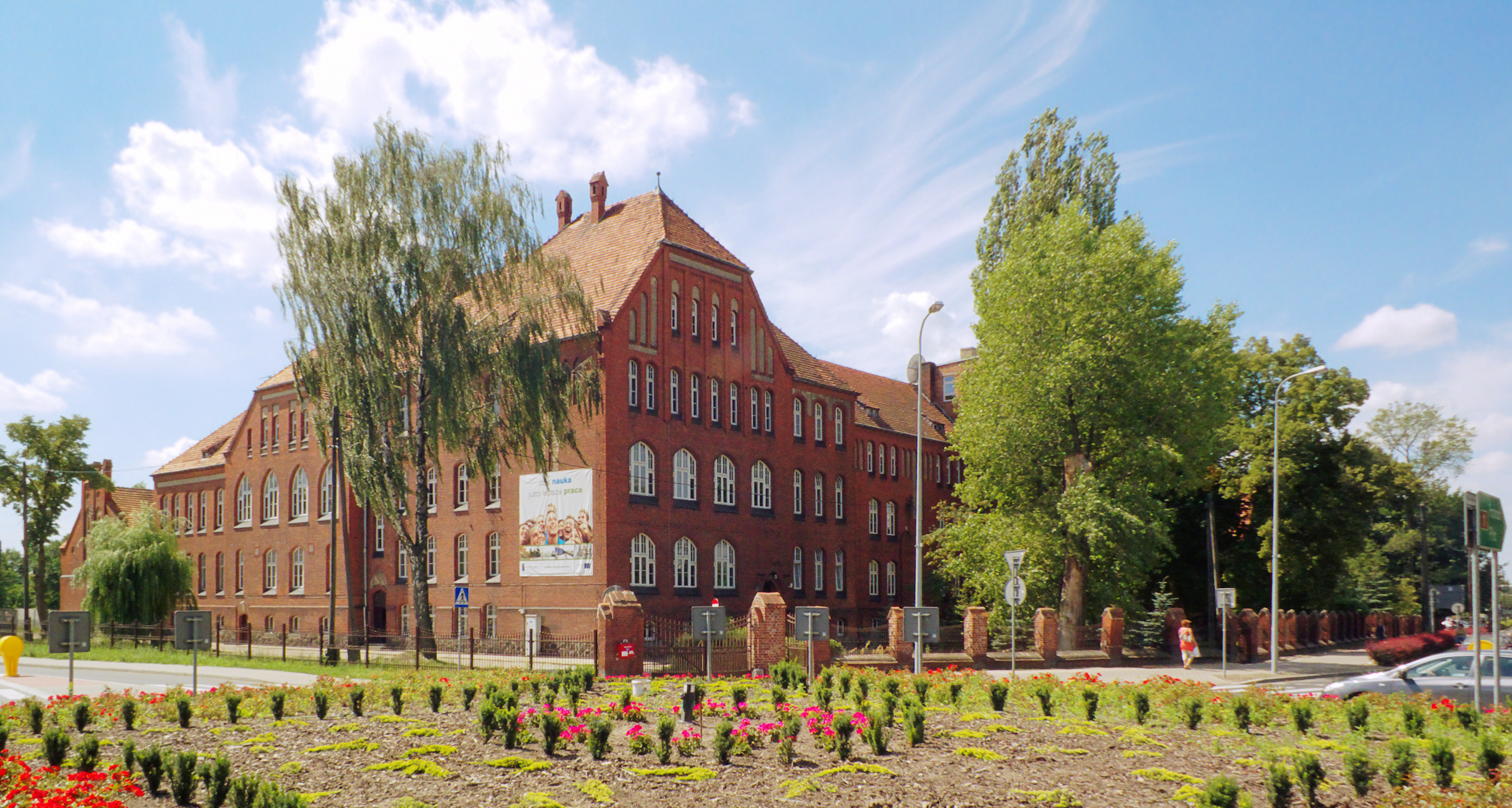
Hipolit Cegielski School Complex

== Sports ==
The local football team is Wełna Rogoźno. It competes in the lower leagues.

== Notable residents ==
- Rudolf Bornhof (1914–1944), Wehrmacht officer
- Marcus Jastrow (1829–1903), Talmudic scholar
- Antoni Przybylski (1913–1985), Polish-Australian astronomer
