= Szczytno (disambiguation) =

Szczytno may refer to the following places:

- Szczytno, Kuyavian-Pomeranian Voivodeship (north-central Poland)
- Szczytno, Płock County in Masovian Voivodeship (east-central Poland)
- Szczytno in Warmian-Masurian Voivodeship (north Poland)
- Szczytno, Płońsk County in Masovian Voivodeship (east-central Poland)
- Szczytno, Warsaw West County in Masovian Voivodeship (east-central Poland)
- Szczytno, Greater Poland Voivodeship (west-central Poland)
- Szczytno, Pomeranian Voivodeship (north Poland)
