= Międzylesie, Oborniki County =

Międzylesie
- Village
- Location within Poland
- Coordinates: 52°43′25″N 17°0′29″E
- Country: Poland
- Voivodeship: Greater Poland
- County: Oborniki
- Gmina: Rogoźno
- Population: 122
- Time zone: UTC+1 (CET)
  - Summer (DST): UTC+2 (CEST)
- Vehicle registration: POB

Międzylesie [mjɛnd͡zɨˈlɛɕɛ] is a village in the administrative district of Gmina Rogoźno, within Oborniki County, Greater Poland Voivodeship, in west-central Poland.

== History ==
As part of the Kingdom of Poland, the village was owned by the nearby town of Rogoźno. It was administratively located in the Poznań County in the Poznań Voivodeship in the Greater Poland Province of the Polish Crown.

During the German invasion of Poland, which started World War II in September 1939, the Germans murdered six Poles in the village (see Nazi crimes against the Polish nation).
