= Żołędzin =

- Village
- Location within Poland
- Coordinates: 52°44′55″N 16°56′26″E
- Country: Poland
- Voivodeship: Greater Poland
- County: Oborniki
- Gmina: Rogoźno
- Population: 3

Żołędzin [ʐɔˈwɛnd͡ʑin] is the village in the administrative district of Gmina Rogoźno, within Oborniki County, Greater Poland Voivodeship, in west-central Poland.
