= Tarnowo, Oborniki County =

Tarnowo
- Village
- Location within Poland
- Coordinates: 52°49′N 16°59′E
- Country: Poland
- Voivodeship: Greater Poland
- County: Oborniki
- Gmina: Rogoźno

Tarnowo [tarˈnɔvɔ] is a village in the administrative district of Gmina Rogoźno, within Oborniki County, Greater Poland Voivodeship, in west-central Poland.
