= Karolewo, Oborniki County =

Karolewo
- Village
- Location within Poland
- Coordinates: 52°48′51″N 16°55′43″E
- Country: Poland
- Voivodeship: Greater Poland
- County: Oborniki
- Gmina: Rogoźno
- Population: 130

Karolewo [karɔˈlɛvɔ] is a village in the administrative district of Gmina Rogoźno, within Oborniki County, Greater Poland Voivodeship, in west-central Poland.
