= Cieśle, Oborniki County =

Cieśle
- Village
- Location within Poland
- Coordinates: 52°46′6″N 17°1′0″E
- Country: Poland
- Voivodeship: Greater Poland
- County: Oborniki
- Gmina: Rogoźno
- Population: 141

Cieśle [ˈt͡ɕɛɕlɛ] is a village in the administrative district of Gmina Rogoźno, within Oborniki County, Greater Poland Voivodeship, in west-central Poland.
