= Owczegłowy =

- Village
- Location within Poland
- Coordinates: 52°43′58″N 17°02′35″E
- Country: Poland
- Voivodeship: Greater Poland
- County: Oborniki
- Gmina: Rogoźno

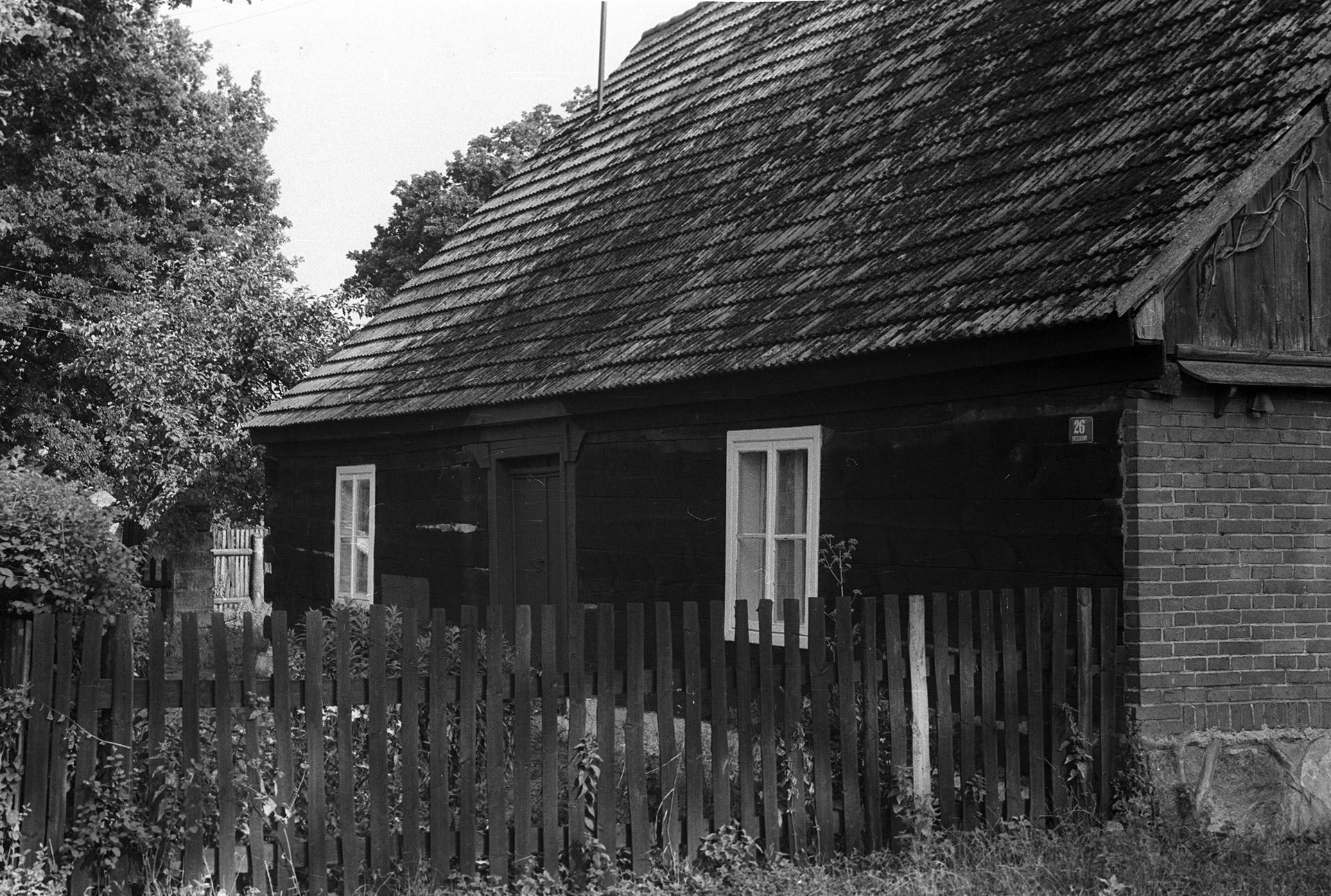
Log cabin with a brick gable.

Owczegłowy [ɔft͡ʂɛˈɡwɔvɨ] is a village in the administrative district of Gmina Rogoźno, within Oborniki County, Greater Poland Voivodeship, in west-central Poland.
