= Gmina Rogoźno =

Gmina Rogoźno Rogoźno Commune
- Gmina
- Flag Coat of arms
- Interactive map of Gmina Rogoźno
- Coordinates (Rogoźno): 52°44′57″N 16°59′59″E
- Country: Poland
- Voivodeship: Greater Poland
- County: Oborniki
- Seat: Rogoźno

Area
  - Total: 217.95 km^{2} (84.15 sq mi)

Population (2006)
  - Total: 17,322
  - Density: 79.477/km^{2} (205.84/sq mi)
  - Urban: 10,905
  - Rural: 6,417
- Website: http://www.rogozno.pl

Gmina Rogoźno is an urban-rural gmina (administrative district) in Oborniki County, Greater Poland Voivodeship, in west-central Poland. Its seat is the town of Rogoźno, which lies approximately 17 kilometres (11 mi) north-east of Oborniki and 40 km (25 mi) north of the regional capital Poznań.

The gmina covers an area of 217.95 square kilometres (84.2 sq mi), and as of 2006 its total population is 17,322 (out of which the population of Rogoźno amounts to 10,905, and the population of the rural part of the gmina is 6,417).

== Villages ==
Apart from the town of Rogoźno, Gmina Rogoźno contains the villages and settlements of Budziszewko, Cieśle, Dziewcza Struga, Garbatka, Gościejewo, Grudna, Jaracz, Józefinowo, Karolewo, Kaziopole, Laskowo, Marlewo, Międzylesie, Nienawiszcz, Nowy Młyn, Olszyna, Owczegłowy, Owieczki, Parkowo, Pruśce, Ruda, Sierniki, Słomowo, Stare, Studzieniec, Szczytno, Tarnowo, Wełna, Wojciechowo and Żołędzin.

== Neighbouring gminas ==
Gmina Rogoźno is bordered by the gminas of Budzyń, Murowana Goślina, Oborniki, Ryczywół, Skoki and Wągrowiec.
