= Budziszewko =

- Village
- Location within Poland
- Coordinates: 52°42′N 17°5′E
- Country: Poland
- Voivodeship: Greater Poland
- County: Oborniki
- Gmina: Rogoźno
- Population: 1,040

Budziszewko [bud͡ʑiˈʂɛfkɔ] is a village in the administrative district of Gmina Rogoźno, within Oborniki County, Greater Poland Voivodeship, in west-central Poland.
