= Nowy Młyn, Oborniki County =

Nowy Młyn
- Village
- Location within Poland
- Coordinates: 52°45′28″N 16°56′46″E
- Country: Poland
- Voivodeship: Greater Poland
- County: Oborniki
- Gmina: Rogoźno

Nowy Młyn [ˈnɔvɨ ˈmwɨn] is a village in the administrative district of Gmina Rogoźno, within Oborniki County, Greater Poland Voivodeship, in west-central Poland.
