= Nienawiszcz =

- Village
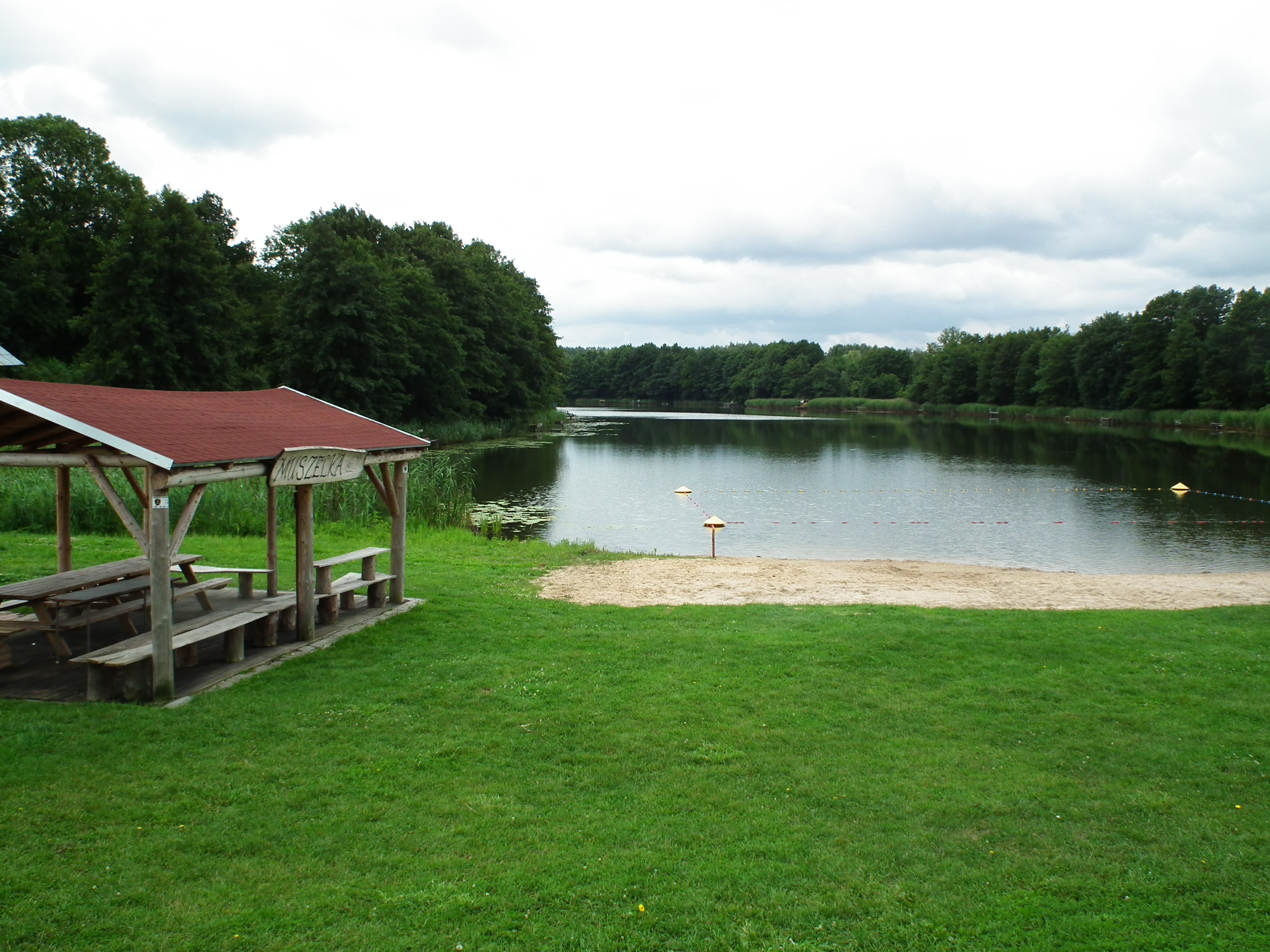
- Jezioro Nienawiszcz Duża (Lake in Nienawiszcz)

- Location within Poland
- Coordinates: 52°40′59″N 16°59′45″E
- Country: Poland
- Voivodeship: Greater Poland
- County: Oborniki
- Gmina: Rogoźno
- Postal code: 64-610
- Vehicle registration: POB
- SIMC: 0529031

Nienawiszcz [ɲɛˈnaviʂt͡ʂ] is a village in the administrative district of Gmina Rogoźno, within Oborniki County, Greater Poland Voivodeship, in west-central Poland.
