= Józefinowo, Oborniki County =

Józefinowo
- Village
- Location within Poland
- Coordinates: 52°42′35″N 16°57′10″E
- Country: Poland
- Voivodeship: Greater Poland
- County: Oborniki
- Gmina: Rogoźno
- Population: 112

Józefinowo [juzɛfiˈnɔvɔ] is a village in the administrative district of Gmina Rogoźno, within Oborniki County, Greater Poland Voivodeship, in west-central Poland.
