= Studzieniec, Oborniki County =

Studzieniec
- Village
- Location within Poland
- Coordinates: 52°42′N 17°2′E
- Country: Poland
- Voivodeship: Greater Poland
- County: Oborniki
- Gmina: Rogoźno

Studzieniec [stuˈd͡ʑɛɲɛt͡s] is a village in the administrative district of Gmina Rogoźno, within Oborniki County, Greater Poland Voivodeship, in west-central Poland.
