= Wojciechowo, Oborniki County =

Wojciechowo
- Village
- Location within Poland
- Coordinates: 52°43′36″N 17°4′27″E
- Country: Poland
- Voivodeship: Greater Poland
- County: Oborniki
- Gmina: Rogoźno
- Population: 18

Wojciechowo (Polish pronunciation: [vɔjt͡ɕɛˈxɔvɔ]) is a village in the administrative district of Gmina Rogoźno, within Oborniki County, Greater Poland Voivodeship, in west-central Poland.
