= Grudna, Oborniki County =

Grudna
- Village
- Location within Poland
- Coordinates: 52°44′N 16°54′E
- Country: Poland
- Voivodeship: Greater Poland
- County: Oborniki
- Gmina: Rogoźno

Grudna [ˈɡrudna] is a village in the administrative district of Gmina Rogoźno, within Oborniki County, Greater Poland Voivodeship, in west-central Poland.
