= Laskowo, Oborniki County =

Laskowo
- Village
- Location within Poland
- Coordinates: 52°48′N 17°0′E
- Country: Poland
- Voivodeship: Greater Poland
- County: Oborniki
- Gmina: Rogoźno

Laskowo ([lasˈkɔvɔ]; German: Laskowo, 1943–45 Amalienruh) is a village in the administrative district of Gmina Rogoźno, within Oborniki County, Greater Poland Voivodeship, in west-central Poland.
