= Gražina Sviderskytė =

Gražina Sviderskytė (born March 22, 1973, in Vilnius) is a Lithuanian newscaster and author, currently working on documentary films. Together with the famous Lithuanian pilot, Jurgis Kairys, Gražina Sviderskytė won the CNN Best Reporter Award in 2001, for her work "Skrydis po tiltu" (Flight beneath the Bridge). She also produced several documentary films, including "Uragano kapitonas" (Hurricane Captain), about the World War II war pilot Romualdas Marcinkus, and "Šimtmečio kontrabanda, Paskutinis reisas" (Contraband of the Century, the Last Journey) about the smuggling of artwork and art collections. Gražina Sviderskytė is also a passionate lover of aviation and flying, and has a pilot's license. In December 2011, she presented her new project on S. Darius and S. Girenas at TEDxVilnius.
