= Kaziopole =

- Village
- Location within Poland
- Coordinates: 52°45′N 16°55′E
- Country: Poland
- Voivodeship: Greater Poland
- County: Oborniki
- Gmina: Rogoźno

Kaziopole [kaʑɔˈpɔlɛ] is a village in the administrative district of Gmina Rogoźno, within Oborniki County, Greater Poland Voivodeship, in west-central Poland.
