= Gordon Brettell =

Royal Air Force officer

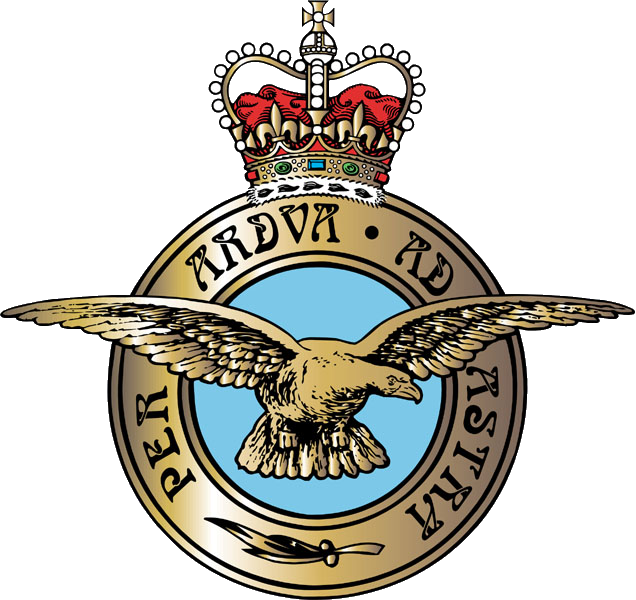
- Born: Edward Gordon Brettell; 19 March 1915; Chertsey, Surrey
- Died: 29 March 1944 (aged 29); Danzig
- Burial place: Poznan Old Garrison Cemetery, Poland
- Military career
- Allegiance: United Kingdom
- Branch: Royal Air Force
- Service years: 1939–1944
- Rank: Flight lieutenant
- Service number: 61053
- Units: No. 92 Squadron RAF; No. 133 (Eagle) Squadron RAF
- Conflicts: World War II: Channel Front (POW)
- Awards: Distinguished Flying Cross; Mention in despatches

Edward Gordon Brettell DFC (19 March 1915 – 29 March 1944), known as Gordon Brettell, was a British Spitfire fighter pilot who was taken prisoner during the Second World War. He took part in the 'Great Escape' from Stalag Luft III in March 1944, but was one of the men re-captured and subsequently shot by the Gestapo.

== Pre-war ==
Gordon Brettell was born in Chertsey Surrey, the son of Eileen and stockbroker Vivian Brettell and after attending Cheltenham College gained a bachelor of arts degree from Clare College, Cambridge University and then lived in the family home at St Ann’s Hill before embarking on a career in his Austin 7 as a motor racing driver.

== War service ==
He enlisted in the Royal Air Force at the start of 1940 as an aircraftman pilot candidate with the service number 61053. On completion of flight training he was commissioned as pilot officer on 17 February 1941. From final stage training at No. 58 Operational Training Unit Brettell Joined No. 92 Squadron RAF flying the Spitfire on 3 March 1941 and on 4 September 1941 probably shot down a Messerschmitt Bf 109 in combat.

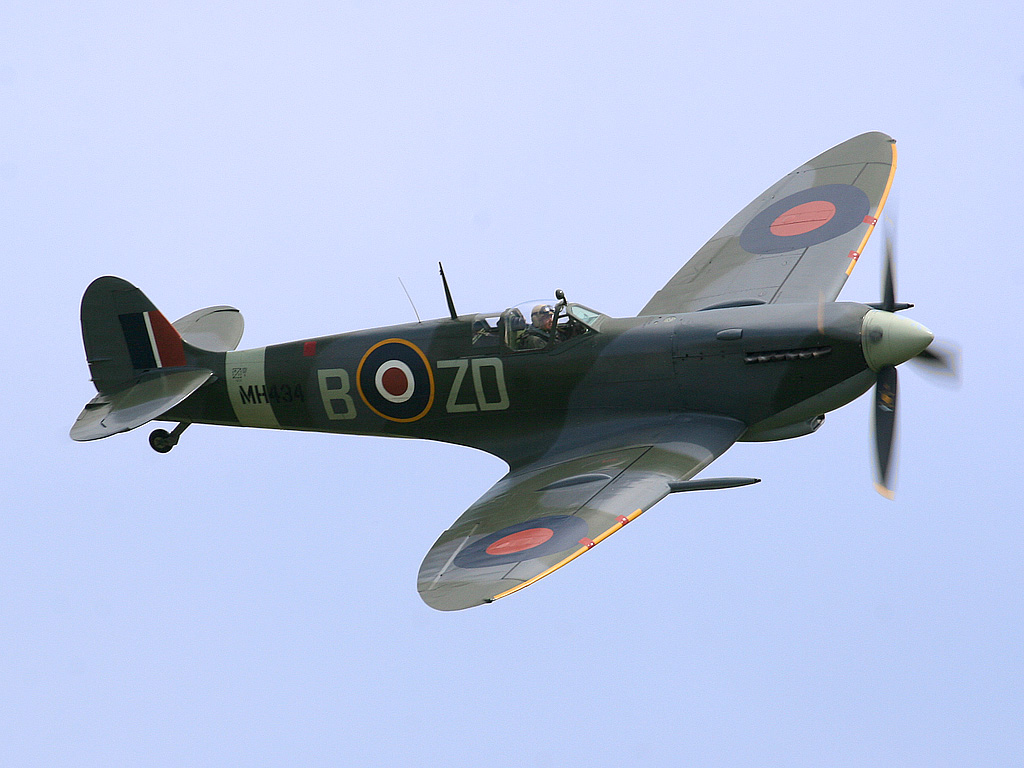
Spitfire fighter

He was promoted to flying officer on 17 February 1942 and in the summer of 1942 he was posted to No. 133 (Eagle) Squadron RAF at Lympne as a flight commander, the only British officer within the volunteer US unit. He was temporarily in command of the squadron. During his service with 133 Squadron, led by Don Blakeslee, he flew over the Dieppe beaches as top cover while the amphibious commando raid took place on 19 August 1942 and shot down a Focke-Wulf Fw 190 fighter during the mission. On 29 September 1942 he was awarded the Distinguished Flying Cross for his service with 133 (Eagle) Squadron, his citation stating,

This officer has participated in 111 sorties over enemy occupied territory. He has always displayed the greatest keenness to engage the enemy. On one occasion he was wounded in combat and, on recovery, he resumed operational flying with renewed zest. He is an excellent flight commander.

== Prisoner of war ==
Leading 133 Squadron on a bomber escort mission he took off in a Supermarine Spitfire Mark IX fighter (serial number BS313) on 26 September 1942 to escort a group of B-17 bombers to Morlaix. The entire formation was blown far off course by adverse winds and only one of the twelve aircraft of 133 Squadron made it back to England after attacks by fighters, anti-aircraft fire and fuel shortage. Brettell was captured and badly injured, becoming a prisoner of war. He was sent to Stalag Luft III in the province of Lower Silesia near the town of Sagan (now Żagań in Poland). Here he became an enthusiastic member of the escape committee specializing in forged documents and hand producing rubber stamps from linoleum and rubber boot heels to authenticate the documents and fashioning embossing tools from toothbrushes. He was promoted to flight lieutenant in captivity on 17 February 1943 and by 1943 had participated in at least one previous escape attempt. He spent time "outside the wire" after breaking out from Stalag Luft III with Kingsley Brown on 27 March 1943. They travelled some distance on the railways and at one stage shared a compartment with a number of German soldiers.

== 'Great Escape' ==
Working with "Tim" Walenn the camp’s head of forgery and Henri Picard they produced forged passports, movement orders, railway documentation and all manner of identity papers to move about Germany. Brettell was one of the 76 men who escaped the prison camp on the night of 24–25 March 1944, in the escape now famous as "the Great Escape". Travelling in a group of four escapees with Tim Walenn, Romualdas Marcinkus and Henri Picard, all posing as Lithuanian workers they managed to reach a train heading towards Danzig (now Gdańsk, Poland). Most likely, they intended to travel to East Prussia and cross the Lithuanian border hoping to cross the Baltic Sea to neutral Sweden. When the Germans discovered the escape they began manhunts. Brettell and his group travelled further than most of the escapees but were captured by the Gestapo near Schneidemühl on 26 March. The party of four were brought to Stalag XX-B and spent the night there. On the following day they were handed over to the Danzig Gestapo. Its officials took the men to a forest near Gross Trampken (Trąbki Wielkie) and executed them. On 29 March, his body was cremated in Danzig's crematorium. He was one of the 50 escapers executed and murdered by the Gestapo. His ashes, originally buried at Sagan, are now buried in part of the Poznan Old Garrison Cemetery. Brettell’s headstone has the inscription chosen by his parents: "Those who are nearer to God, Are not farther from us". Brettell's name was amongst those in the list of the murdered prisoners which was published when news broke on or about 20 May 1944.

Memorial to "The Fifty" down the road toward Żagań (Brettell is near top left)

== Awards ==
Brettell was awarded the Distinguished Flying Cross on 29 September 1942 for his service with 133 (Eagle) Squadron RAF. He was posthumously mentioned in despatches in June 1944, recognizing his conspicuous bravery as a prisoner because none of the other relevant decorations then available could be awarded posthumously.

== Other victims ==
See Stalag Luft III murders

The Gestapo executed a group of 50 of the recaptured prisoners representing almost all of the nationalities involved in the escape. Post-war investigations saw a number of those guilty of the murders tracked down, arrested and tried for their crimes.

Nationalities of the 50 executed
(United Kingdom) 21 British
(Canada) 6 Canadian
(Poland) 6 Polish
(Australia) 5 Australian
(South Africa) 3 South African
(New Zealand) 2 New Zealanders
(Norway) 2 Norwegian
(Belgium) 1 Belgian
(Czechoslovakia) 1 Czechoslovak
(France) 1 Frenchman
(Greece) 1 Greek
(Lithuania) 1 Lithuanian

== Bibliography ==
- Ted Barris (2014). The Great Escape. Dundurn Publishing. ISBN 978-1459728448.
- Simon Read (2012). Human Game. Constable. ISBN 978-1-4721-1262-0.
- Sean Feast (2015). The Last of the 39-ers. Grub Street. ISBN 978-1909166158.
- Jonathan F Vance (2000). A Gallant Company. Pacifica Military. ISBN 978-0-935-55347-5.
- William Ash; Brendan Foley (2005). Under the Wire: The Wartime Memoir of a Spitfire Pilot, Legendary Escape Artist and 'cooler King'. Bantam. ISBN 978-0-593-05408-6.
- Paul Brickhill (2004). The Great Escape. W.W. Norton & Company. ISBN 978-0-393-32579-9.
- Norman L R Franks (1992). The Greatest Air Battle, Dieppe 19th August 1942. Grub Street. ISBN 978-0948817588.
- Alan Burgess (1990). The Longest Tunnel: The True Story of World War II's Great Escape. Naval Institute Press. ISBN 978-1-59114-097-9.
- Albert P. Clark (2005). 33 Months as a POW in Stalag Luft III: A World War II Airman Tells His Story. Fulcrum Pub. ISBN 978-1-55591-536-0.
- Arthur A. Durand (1 January 1989). Stalag Luft III: The Secret Story. Patrick Stephens Limited. ISBN 978-1-85260-248-2.
- Norman L R Franks (1997). RAF Fighter Command Losses, Volume 2. Midland Counties. ISBN 1-85780-075-3.
- Allen Andrews (1976). Exemplary Justice. Harrap. ISBN 0-245-52775-3.
- Christopher Shores (2004). Those Other Eagles. Grub Street. ISBN 1-904010-88-1.
- Vern Haugland (1980). The Eagle Squadrons. David and Charles. ISBN 0-7153-7940-2.
- Brian J Turner (2024). Eagles Last Flight. Amazon. ISBN 978-8397138100.
