= Garbatka, Greater Poland Voivodeship =

Garbatka
- Village
- Location within Poland
- Coordinates: 52°44′N 16°58′E
- Country: Poland
- Voivodeship: Greater Poland
- County: Oborniki
- Gmina: Rogoźno

Garbatka [ɡarˈbatka] is a village in the administrative district of Gmina Rogoźno, within Oborniki County, Greater Poland Voivodeship, in west-central Poland.
