= Henri Picard =

Belgian WW2 pilot (1916–1944)

Henri Albert Picard
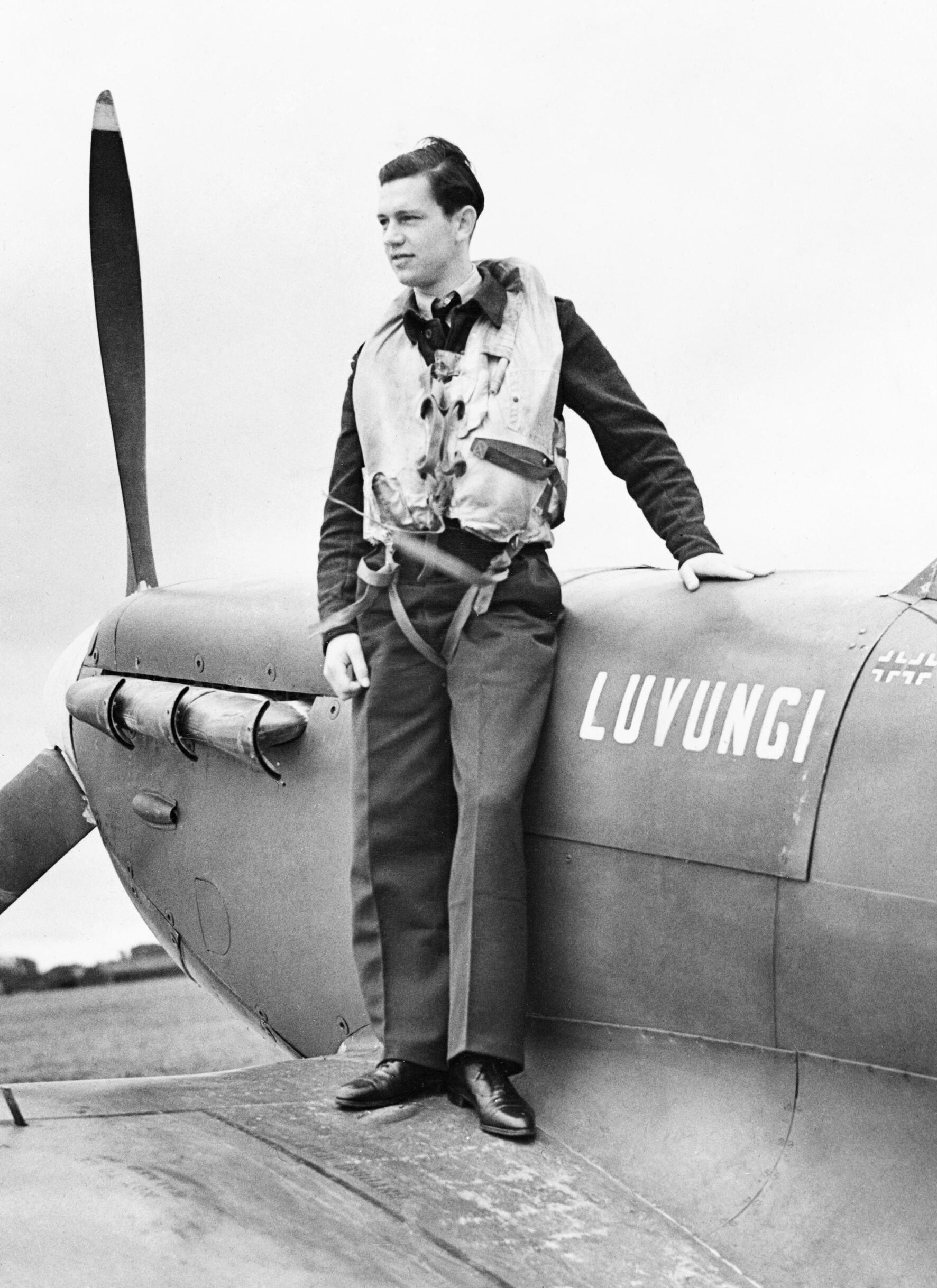
- Henri Picard with his Spitfire in July 1942. Note the two victory markings beside his cockpit.
- Born: Henri Picard; 17 April 1916; Etterbeek, Belgium
- Died: 29 March 1944 (aged 27) near Danzig, Poland
- Burial place: Poznań Old Garrison Cemetery, Poland
- Military career
- Allegiance: Belgium
- Branch: Royal Air Force
- Service years: 1936–1944
- Rank: Flight Lieutenant
- Service number: 87693
- Unit: No. 350 Squadron RAF
- Conflicts: World War II; Channel Front (POW)
- Awards: Mentioned in despatches Order of Leopold Knight's Cross. Croix de guerre (Belgium)

Henri Picard (17 April 1916 – 29 March 1944) was a Belgian Supermarine Spitfire pilot who was taken prisoner during the Second World War. He took part in the 'Great Escape' from Stalag Luft III in March 1944 and was one of the men re-captured and subsequently shot by the Gestapo.

== Pre-war life ==
Henri Albert Picard was born in Etterbeek, a suburb of Brussels, in Belgium. He entered the Ecole Militaire on 26 December 1936 to train as a Belgian Army officer for the Chasseurs Ardennais. During training he developed a fascination for aviation, extended his service contract in November 1937 and entered the Ecole d'Aeronautique in December 1938 to train as an air observer, graduating as a sous-lieutenant d'Aeronautique in June 1939 but now determined to become a pilot he trained to fly at the Ecole de Pilotage in January 1940.

== War service ==
After the German invasion of Belgium in May 1940 the school was evacuated to France and then to Algeria and on to Morocco. On 28 June 1940 he and 59 other Belgian pilot students of the 83rd Class travelled to Gibraltar and sailed for the United Kingdom, arriving on 14 July 1940. At RAF Gloucester he was commissioned pilot officer in the Royal Air Force Volunteer Reserve (RAFVR) on 8 November 1940 and completed his pilot training. He survived a taxiing crash in January 1941. Picard received his operational training in Scotland at No. 58 Operational Training Unit at RAF Grangemouth in July 1941 and in August joined No. 131 Squadron RAF in the Belgian flight. On 28 September 1941 in England while taxiing Picard failed to see a Miles Magister aircraft on the runway at RAF Atcham airfield in Shropshire and collided with it killing two fellow pilots. On 14 November 1941 he was posted to No. 350 (Belgian) Squadron at RAF Valley in Wales, flying convoy escorts in Supermarine Spitfire fighters until April 1942 when they transferred to RAF Kenley for fighter sweeps over occupied France.

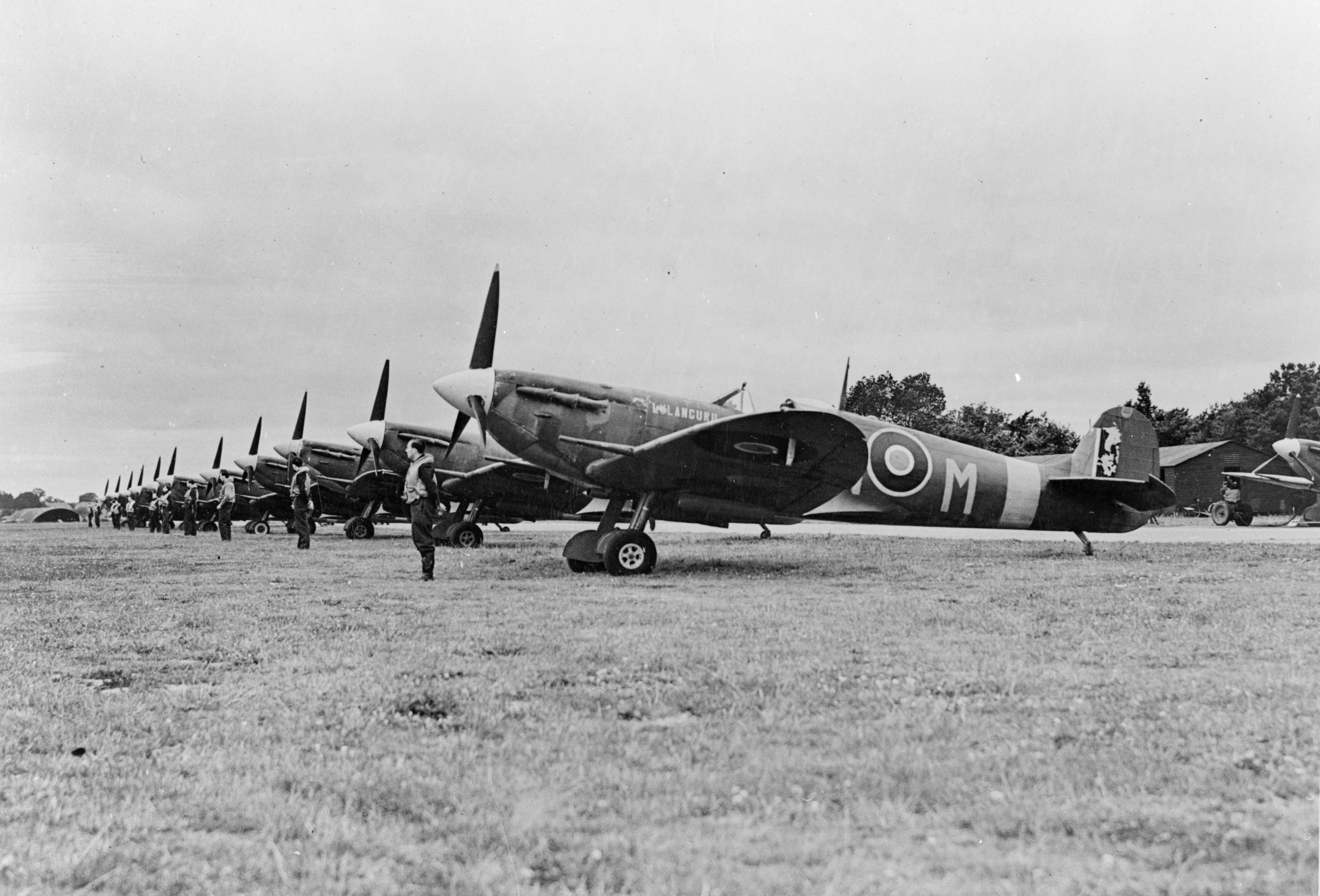
Spitfires of No. 350 Squadron at RAF Kenley

Picard was awarded the croix de guerre avec two palms after he shot down two Luftwaffe Focke-Wulf Fw 190 fighters over Sangatte at about 16:50 hours GMT during an operation flown on 29 June 1942. On 16 August 1942 flying Supermarine Spitfire Mark Vb (serial number "EN796") he was flying on a low level ground attack operation near Merville during which a fellow pilot crash landed after hitting a water tower and Picard only just made it home, his own aircraft severely damaged after striking high tension cables. Picard was involved in the combat supporting the amphibious landings at Dieppe on 19 August 1942 and shared in the destruction of a Luftwaffe Focke-Wulf Fw 190.

== Prisoner of war ==
On 27 August 1942, Picard took part in a mission over Occupied France known as "Circus 208" flying Supermarine Spitfire Mark Vb (serial number "BM297") during which he was shot down by Focke-Wulf Fw 190 fighters over the English Channel off Abbeville area around mid-day. On the same day, also flying a Spitfire, Halldor Espelid, a Norwegian "Great Escaper" was also shot down and taken prisoner just a few miles distant. Picard baled out and parachuted into the sea wounded only to spend almost 6 days adrift before being washed up on the French coast and made prisoner of war.

Following his recovery in hospital, Picard was held as Prisoner No. 685 at Stalag Luft III in the province of Lower Silesia near the town of Sagan (now Żagań in Poland). During his time in captivity, he was promoted to flying officer, and then acting flight lieutenant. As a skilled artist, he was one of the fifty document forgers working alongside Gordon Brettell, Romualdas Marcinkus and Tim Walenn, and modelled perfect replica German rifles (carbines) for the use of men trying to escape in German uniform.

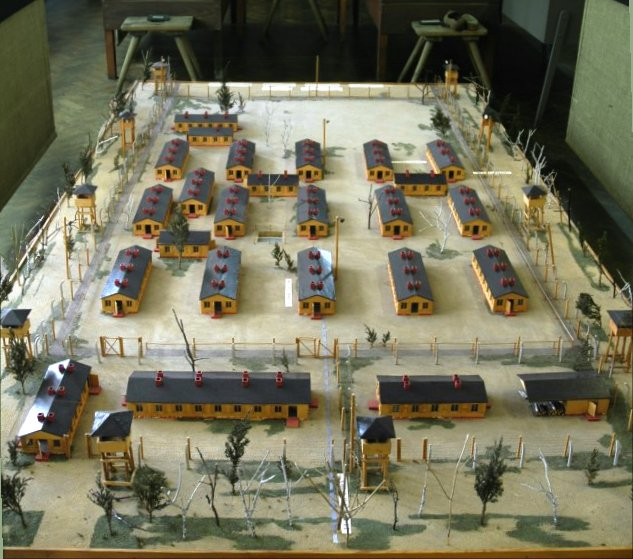
Model of Stalag Luft III prison camp.

== 'Great Escape' ==
Picard was one of the 76 men who escaped the prison camp on the night of 24–25 March 1944, in the escape now famous as "the Great Escape".

Travelling in a group of four, the escapees posed as foreign labourers, with Gordon Brettell and Picard as Frenchmen, and Romualdas Marcinkus and Tim Walenn as Lithuanians. They managed to board a train heading towards Frankfurt (Oder), and Danzig (now Gdańsk, Poland). Most likely, they intended to travel to East Prussia and over the Lithuanian border hoping to cross the Baltic Sea to neutral Sweden. When the Germans discovered the escape they began manhunts. Picard and the group travelled further than most of the escapees but were captured by the Gestapo on 26 March. The party of four were brought to Stalag XX-B, then spent the night there, their presence being carefully recorded by the camp sergeant-major who issued them with clothing more suited to a prisoner of war in the hope of avoiding the possibility of them being charged with espionage. On the following day they were handed over to the Danzig Gestapo. Its officials took the men to a forest near Gross Trampken (Trąbkie Wielkie) and executed them on 29 March his body was cremated in Danzig's Gestapo crematorium.

Picard was one of the 50 escapers who had been listed by SS-Gruppenfuhrer Arthur Nebe to be killed, so was amongst those executed and murdered by the Gestapo. Originally his remains were buried at Sagan, but he is now buried in part of the Poznań Old Garrison Cemetery beside his fellow escapers. He is commemorated by name on the "North Weald Memorial" at St Andrews Church, North Weald.

Picard's name was amongst those in the list of the murdered prisoners which was published when news broke on or about 20 May 1944.

Memorial to "The Fifty" down the road toward Żagań (Picard at right)

A memorial plaque in his name was unveiled at Beauvechain air force based in Belgium on 1 December 1951.

Some his private papers from 1940 survive in the Imperial War Museum in London.

== Awards ==
- Order of Leopold, Knight's Cross.
- Croix de guerre (Belgium) avec 2 Palmes – June 1942 for success as a fighter pilot. received on 21 July 1942.
- Mention in Despatches in June 1944 by the Royal Air Force for his bravery as a prisoner of war, as none of the other relevant British decorations then available could be awarded posthumously.

== Other victims ==
The Gestapo executed a group of 50 of the recaptured prisoners representing almost all of the nationalities involved in the escape. Post-war investigations saw a number of those guilty of the murders tracked down, arrested and tried for their crimes.

Nationalities of the 50 executed
(United Kingdom) 21 British
(Canada) 6 Canadian
(Poland) 6 Polish
(Australia) 5 Australian
(South Africa) 3 South African
(New Zealand) 2 New Zealanders
(Norway) 2 Norwegian
(Belgium) 1 Belgian
(Czechoslovakia) 1 Czechoslovak
(France) 1 Frenchman
(Greece) 1 Greek
(Lithuania) 1 Lithuanian
