= Szczytno, Greater Poland Voivodeship =

Szczytno
- Village
- Location within Poland
- Coordinates: 52°41′14″N 16°55′40″E
- Country: Poland
- Voivodeship: Greater Poland
- County: Oborniki
- Gmina: Rogoźno
- Population: 35

Szczytno [ˈʂt͡ʂɨtnɔ] is a village in the administrative district of Gmina Rogoźno, within Oborniki County, Greater Poland Voivodeship, in west-central Poland.
