= Sierniki, Oborniki County =

Sierniki
- Village
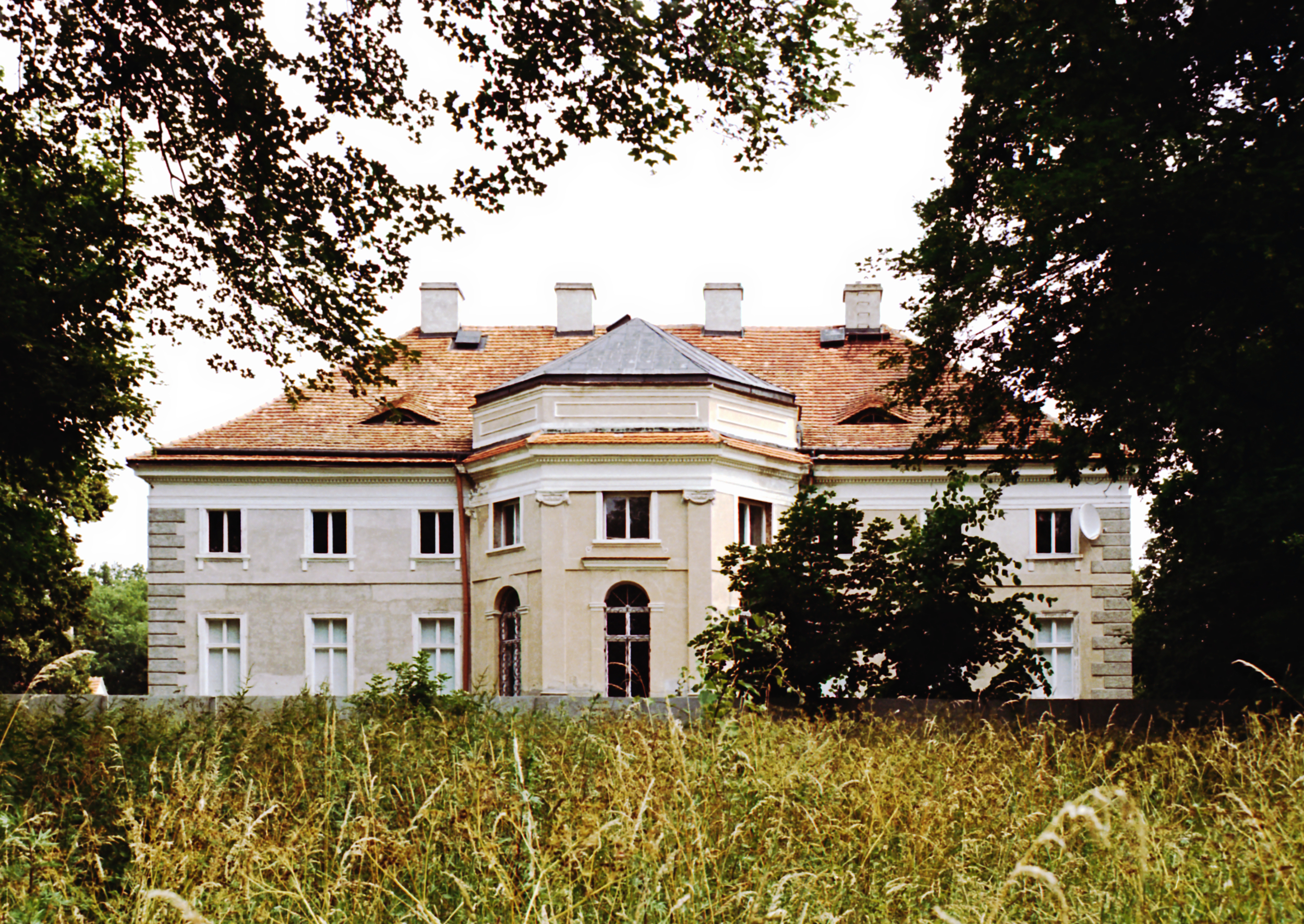
- Radoliński Palace in Sierniki

- Location within Poland
- Coordinates: 52°44′25″N 17°4′44″E
- Country: Poland
- Voivodeship: Greater Poland
- County: Oborniki
- Gmina: Rogoźno
- Population: 280
- Time zone: UTC+1 (CET)
  - Summer (DST): UTC+2 (CEST)
- Vehicle registration: POB

Sierniki [ɕɛrˈniki] is a village in the administrative district of Gmina Rogoźno, within Oborniki County, Greater Poland Voivodeship, in west-central Poland.

== History ==
According to tradition, Sierniki was the place of the death of King Przemysł II in 1296. Having been severely wounded in the course of his kidnap in Rogoźno, it is said that the king was unable to travel further, and was killed in this place by his captors.

Sierniki was a private village of Polish nobility, administratively located in the Gniezno County in the Kalisz Voivodeship in the Greater Poland Province of the Polish Crown. The old Radoliński Palace is located in the village. It was erected by noblewoman Katarzyna Radolińska.
