= Stare, Oborniki County =

Stare
- Village
- Location within Poland
- Coordinates: 52°44′57″N 17°06′49″E
- Country: Poland
- Voivodeship: Greater Poland
- County: Oborniki
- Gmina: Rogoźno

Stare [ˈstarɛ] is a village in the administrative district of Gmina Rogoźno, within Oborniki County, Greater Poland Voivodeship, in west-central Poland.
