= Parkowo =

- Village
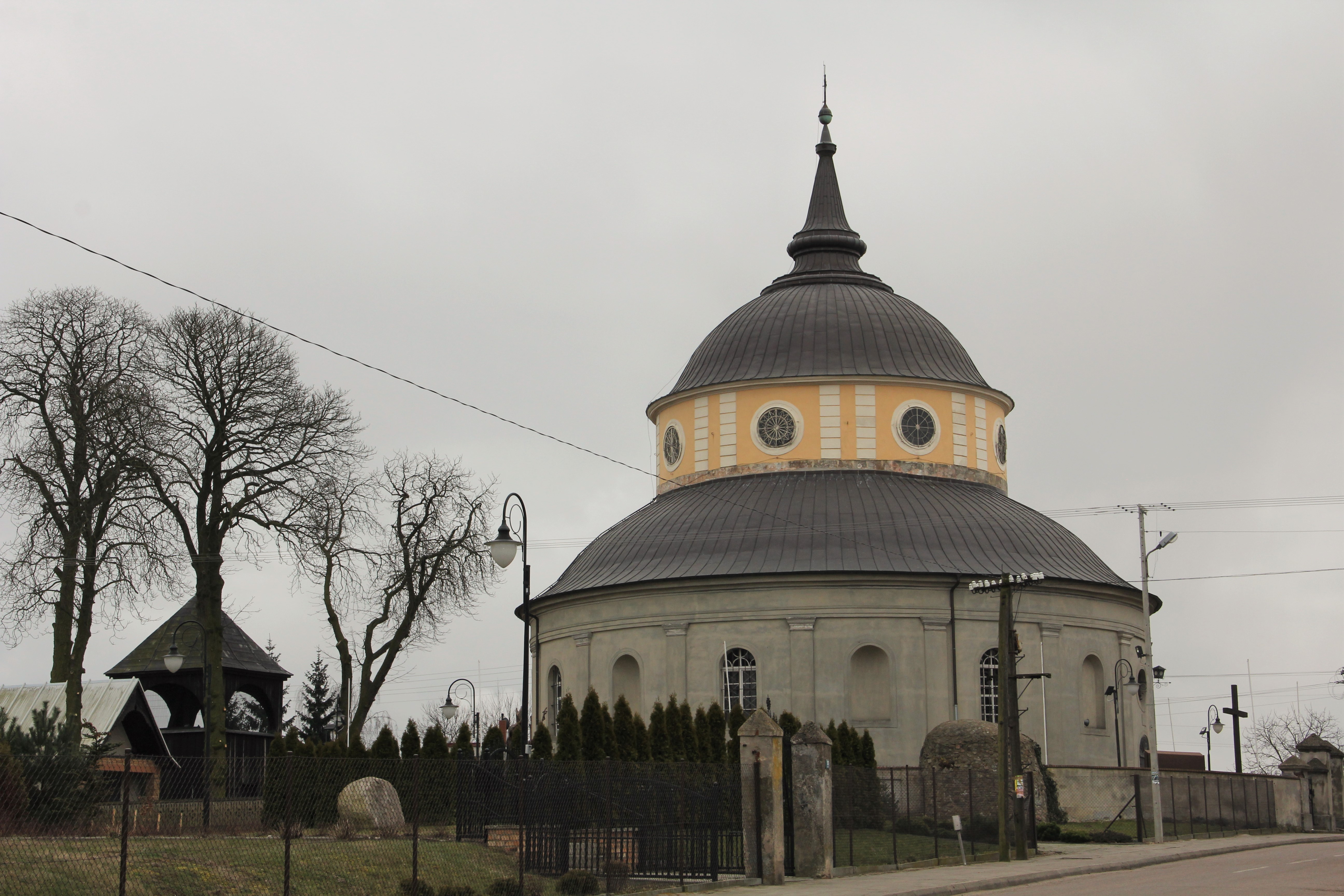
- Church of the Holiest Virgin Mary, Queen of the World

- Location within Poland
- Coordinates: 52°42′N 16°55′E
- Country: Poland
- Voivodeship: Greater Poland
- County: Oborniki
- Gmina: Rogoźno
- Population: 1,040

Parkowo [parˈkɔvɔ] is a village in the administrative district of Gmina Rogoźno, within Oborniki County, Greater Poland Voivodeship, in west-central Poland.
