= Jaracz, Greater Poland Voivodeship =

Jaracz
- Village
- Location within Poland
- Coordinates: 52°42′N 16°53′E
- Country: Poland
- Voivodeship: Greater Poland
- County: Oborniki
- Gmina: Rogoźno

Jaracz [ˈjarat͡ʂ] is a village in the administrative district of Gmina Rogoźno, within Oborniki County, Greater Poland Voivodeship, in west-central Poland.

Jaracz is the site of a Museum of Milling and Water Equipment, under the auspices of the National Museum of Agriculture in Szreniawa.
