= Wełna, Greater Poland Voivodeship =

Wełna
- Village
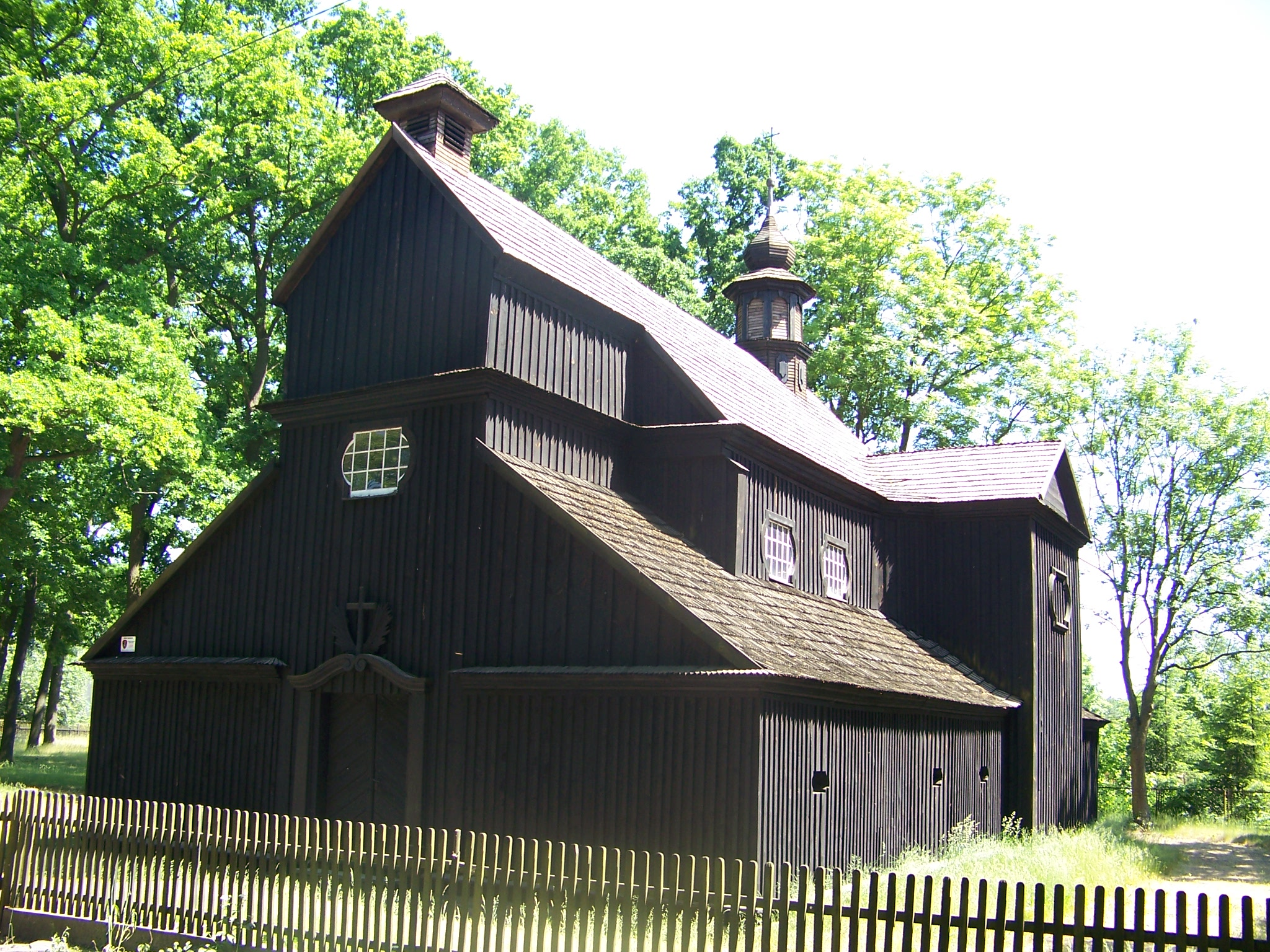
- Exaltation of the Cross Church

- Location within Poland
- Coordinates: 52°43′32″N 16°54′46″E
- Country: Poland
- Voivodeship: Greater Poland
- County: Oborniki
- Gmina: Rogoźno
- Population: 173

Wełna [ˈvɛu̯na] is a village in the administrative district of Gmina Rogoźno, within Oborniki County, Greater Poland Voivodeship, in west-central Poland.
