= Ryczywół =

Ryczywół may refer to the following places:

- Ryczywół, Greater Poland Voivodeship, a village in Gmina Ryczywół, west-central Poland
- Ryczywół, Masovian Voivodeship, a village in east-central Poland
- Ryczywół, Warmian-Masurian Voivodeship, a village in northeastern Poland
- Gmina Ryczywół, an administrative district in west-central Poland
