= Nazi war crimes in occupied Poland during World War II =

Coordinates: 52°13′N 21°00′E

- Part of Generalplan Ost and Germanisation in Poland (1939–1945)
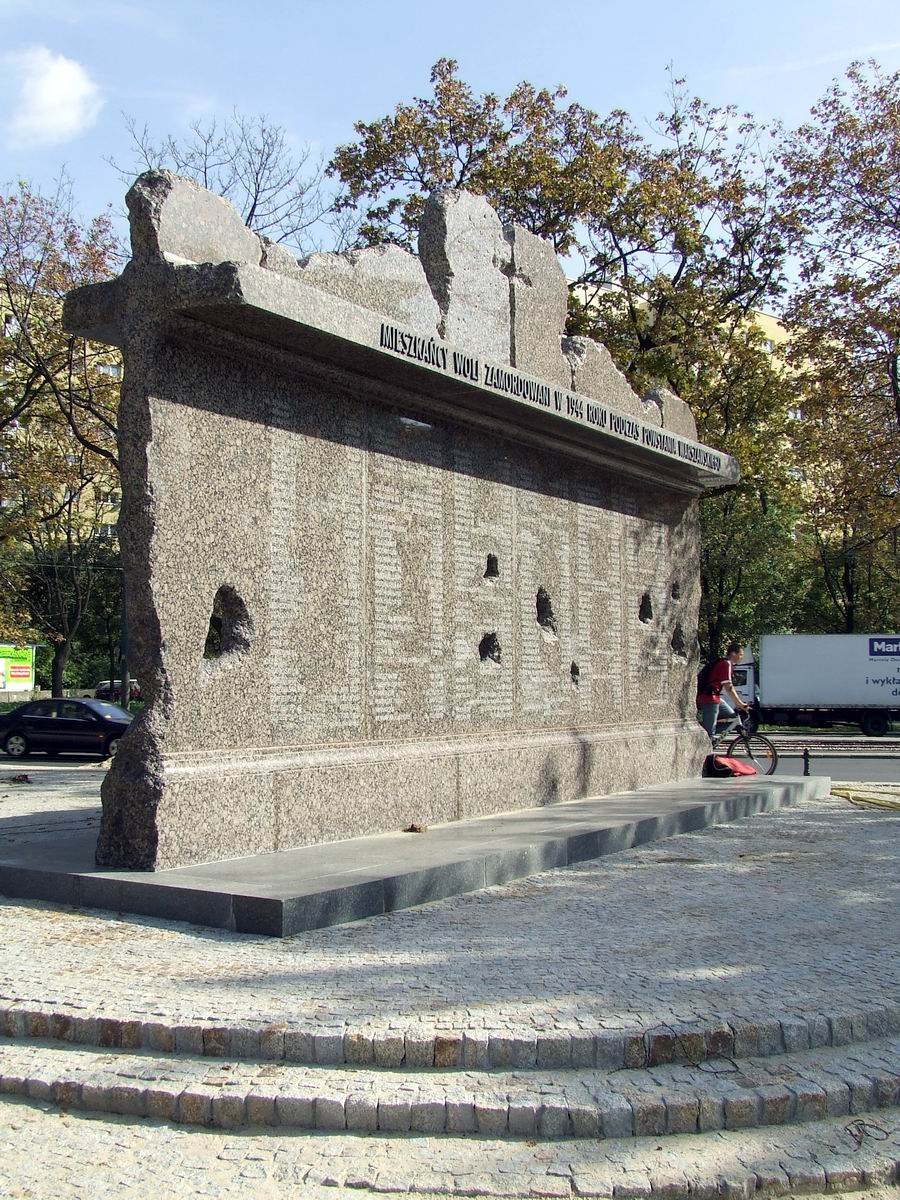
- Memorial to the Wola massacre, the systematic killing of around 40,000–50,000 Polish civilians and enemy combatants by Nazi German troops during the Warsaw Uprising of summer 1944
- Date: 1939–1945
- Location: Occupied Poland
- Cause: Invasion of Poland
- Target: ethnic Poles, Polish Jews
- Participants: Wehrmacht, Gestapo, SS, Orpo, Selbstschutz, Trawnikis, Sonderdienst, BKA, TDA
- Deaths: Around 5.5 million to 6 million (Note: Szarota, Tomasz; Materski, Wojciech, eds. (2009). Polska 1939–1945. Straty osobowe i ofiary represji pod dwiema okupacjami [Poland 1939–1945. Human Losses and Victims of Repression under two Occupations]. Warsaw: Institute of National Remembrance (IPN). Archived from the original on 23 March 2012.: Janusz Kurtyka; Zbigniew Gluza. Preface.: "ze pod okupacja sowiecka zginelo w latach 1939–1941, a nastepnie 1944–1945 co najmniej 150 tys [...] Laczne straty smiertelne ludnosci polskiej pod okupacja niemiecka oblicza sie obecnie na ok. 2 770 000. [...] Do tych strat nalezy doliczyc ponad 100 tys. Polaków pomordowanych w latach 1942–1945 przez nacjonalistów ukrainskich (w tym na samym Wolyniu ok. 60 tys. osób [...] Liczba Zydów i Polaków zydowskiego pochodzenia, obywateli II Rzeczypospolitej, zamordowanych przez Niemców siega 2,7– 2,9 mln osób." Translation: "It must be assumed losses of at least 150.000 people during the Soviet occupation from 1939 to 1941 and again from 1944 to 1945 [...] The total fatalities of the Polish population under the German occupation are now estimated at 2,770,000. [...] To these losses should be added more than 100,000 Poles murdered in the years 1942–1945 by Ukrainian nationalists (including about 60,000 in Volhynia [...] The number of Jews and Poles of Jewish ethnicity, citizens of the Second Polish Republic, murdered by the Germans amounts to 2.7–2.9 million people."; Waldemar Grabowski. German and Soviet occupation. Fundamental issues.: "Straty ludnosci panstwa polskiego narodowosci ukrainskiej sa trudne do wyliczenia," Translation: "The losses of ethnic Poles of Ukrainian nationality are difficult to calculate."; Note: Polish losses amount to 11.3% of the 24.4 million ethnic Poles in prewar Poland and about 90 percent of the 3.3 million Jews of prewar times. The IPN figures do not include losses among Polish citizens of Ukrainian and Belarusian ethnicity.): 2 million ethnic Poles; 3 million Polish Jews; 1 million Polish citizens with other nationality

Crimes against the Polish nation committed by Nazi Germany and Axis collaborationist forces during the invasion of Poland, along with auxiliary battalions during the subsequent occupation of Poland in World War II, included the genocide of millions of Polish people, especially the systematic extermination of Jewish Poles. (Note: Quote: "To conclude: the Germans committed genocide against the Polish population. The very term genocide comes from the 1944 book of the Polish-Jewish jurist Raphael Lemkin, whose study of Nazi-occupied Europe focused on the German attack on the Poles. Not only did the Nazis seek ultimately to eliminate the Polish nation 'as such', but they engaged in each of the acts identified by the 1949 Genocide Convention as signifiers of the 'intent to destroy'") These mass killings were enacted by the Nazis with further plans that were justified by their racial theories, which regarded Poles and other Slavs, and especially Jews, as racially inferior Untermenschen.

By 1942, the Nazis were implementing their plan to murder every Jew in German-occupied Europe, and had also developed plans to reduce the Polish people through mass murder, ethnic cleansing, enslavement and extermination through labor, and assimilation into German identity of a small minority of Poles deemed "racially valuable". During World War II, the Germans not only murdered millions of Poles, but ethnically cleansed millions more through forced deportation to make room for German settlers (see Generalplan Ost and Lebensraum). These actions claimed the lives of 2.7 to 3 million Polish Jews and 1.8 to 2.77 million ethnic Poles, according to Poland's Institute of National Remembrance. German occupation policies in Poland have been recognized in Europe as a genocide, characterized by extremely large death tolls compared to Nazi atrocities in Western European states.

The genocidal policies of the German government's colonization plan, Generalplan Ost (GPO), were the blueprint for war crimes and crimes against humanity committed against the Polish nation from 1939 to 1945. The Nazi master plan entailed the expulsion and mass extermination of some 85 percent (over 20 million) of ethnic Poles in Poland, the remaining 15 percent to be turned into slave labor. While the final objectives of Hunger Plan and GPO were always pursued by the Nazi regime, it could not complete these programmes due to German defeat in World War II. In 2000, by an act of the Polish Parliament, dissemination of knowledge on World War II crimes in Poland by Nazi Germany and the Soviet Union was entrusted to the Institute of National Remembrance.

From the start of the war against Poland, Germany intended to realize Adolf Hitler's plan, set out in his book Mein Kampf, to acquire "living space" (German: Lebensraum) in the east for massive settlement of German colonists. Hitler's plan combined classic imperialism with Nazi racial theories. In the Obersalzberg Speech delivered on 22 August 1939, just before the invasion of Poland, Hitler gave explicit permission to his commanders to murder "without pity or mercy, all men, women, and children of Polish descent or language."

Ethnic cleansing was to be conducted systematically against the Polish people. On 7 September 1939, Sicherheitsdienst head Reinhard Heydrich stated that all Polish nobles, clergy, and Jews were to be murdered. On 12 September, Wehrmacht chief of staff Wilhelm Keitel added Poland's intelligentsia to the list. On 15 March 1940, Schutzstaffel (SS) chief Heinrich Himmler stated: "All Polish specialists will be exploited in our military–industrial complex. Later, all Poles will disappear from this world. It is imperative that the great German volk consider the elimination of all Polish people as its chief task." At the end of 1940, Hitler confirmed the plan to liquidate "all leading elements in Poland".

== 1939 September Campaign ==
Less than a year before the outbreak of war, on 1 October 1938, the German Army rolled into the Sudetenland in accordance with the Munich Agreement. The operation was completed by 10 October. Two weeks later, on 24 October 1938, Ribbentrop summoned Polish ambassador to Berchtesgaden and presented him with Hitler's Gesamtlösung regarding the Polish Corridor and the Free City of Danzig. Ambassador Lipski refused. Three days later, the first mass deportation of Polish nationals from Nazi Germany began. It was the eviction of Jews who settled in Germany with Polish passports. On 9–10 November 1938, the Kristallnacht attack was carried out by the SA paramilitary forces; thousands of Jews holding Polish citizenship were rounded up and sent via rail to the Polish border and to the Nazi concentration camps. The round-up included 2,000 ethnic Poles living and working there.

"the object of war is . . . physically to destroy the enemy. That is why I have prepared, for the moment only in the East, my ‘Death's Head’ formations with orders to kill without pity or mercy all men, women, and children of Polish descent or language. Only in this way can we obtain the living space we need."

— Hitler's speech to officers of the Wehrmacht High Command at Obersalzberg, 22 August 1939

Also, before the invasion of Poland, the Nazis prepared a detailed list identifying more than 61,000 Polish targets (mostly civilian) by name, with the help of the German minority living in the Second Polish Republic. The list was printed secretly as the 192-page-book called Sonderfahndungsbuch Polen (Special Prosecution Book–Poland), and composed only of names and birthdates. It included politicians, scholars, actors, intelligentsia, doctors, lawyers, nobility, priests, officers and numerous others – as the means at the disposal of the SS paramilitary death squads aided by Selbstschutz executioners. The first Einsatzgruppen of World War II were formed by the SS in the course of the invasion. They were deployed behind the front lines to murder groups of people considered, by virtue of their social status, to be capable of abetting resistance efforts against the Germans. The most widely used lie justifying indiscriminate murders by the mobile death squads was (always the same) made-up claim of purported attack on German forces.

In total, about 150,000 to 200,000 Poles died during the one-month September Campaign of 1939, characterized by the indiscriminate and often deliberate targeting of civilian population by the invading forces. Over 100,000 Poles died in the Luftwaffe's terror bombing operations, like those at Wieluń. Massive air raids were conducted on towns which had no military infrastructure. The town of Frampol, near Lublin, was heavily bombed on 13 September as a test subject for Luftwaffe bombing technique; chosen because of its grid street plan and an easily recognisable central town-hall. Frampol was hit by 700 tonnes of munitions, which destroyed up to 90% of buildings and killed half of its inhabitants. Columns of fleeing refugees were systematically attacked by the German fighter and dive-bomber aircraft.

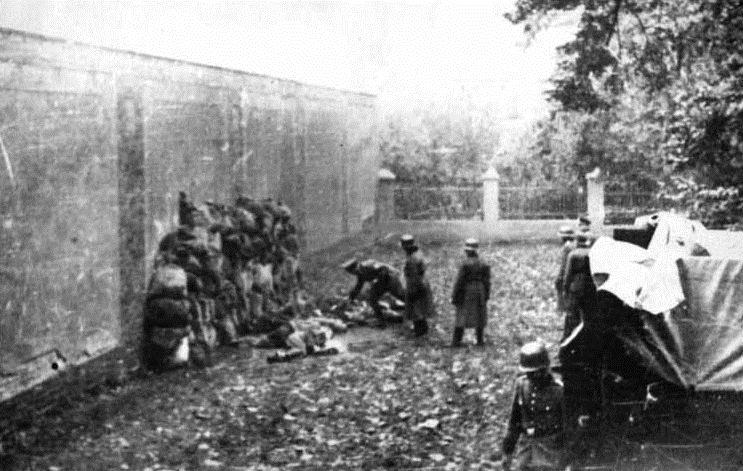
Execution of ethnic Poles by German SS Einsatzkommando soldiers in Leszno, October 1939

Amongst the Polish cities and towns bombed at the beginning of war were: Brodnica, Bydgoszcz, Chełm, Ciechanów, Częstochowa, Grodno, Grudziądz, Gdynia, Janów, Jasło, Katowice, Kielce, Kowel, Kraków, Kutno, Lublin, Lwów, Olkusz, Piotrków, Płock, Płońsk, Poznań, Puck, Radom, Radomsko, Sulejów, Warsaw, Wieluń, Wilno, and Zamość. Over 156 towns and villages were attacked by the Luftwaffe. Warsaw suffered particularly severely with a combination of aerial bombardment and artillery fire reducing large parts of the historic centre to rubble, with more than 60,000 casualties.

=== Terror and pacification operations ===
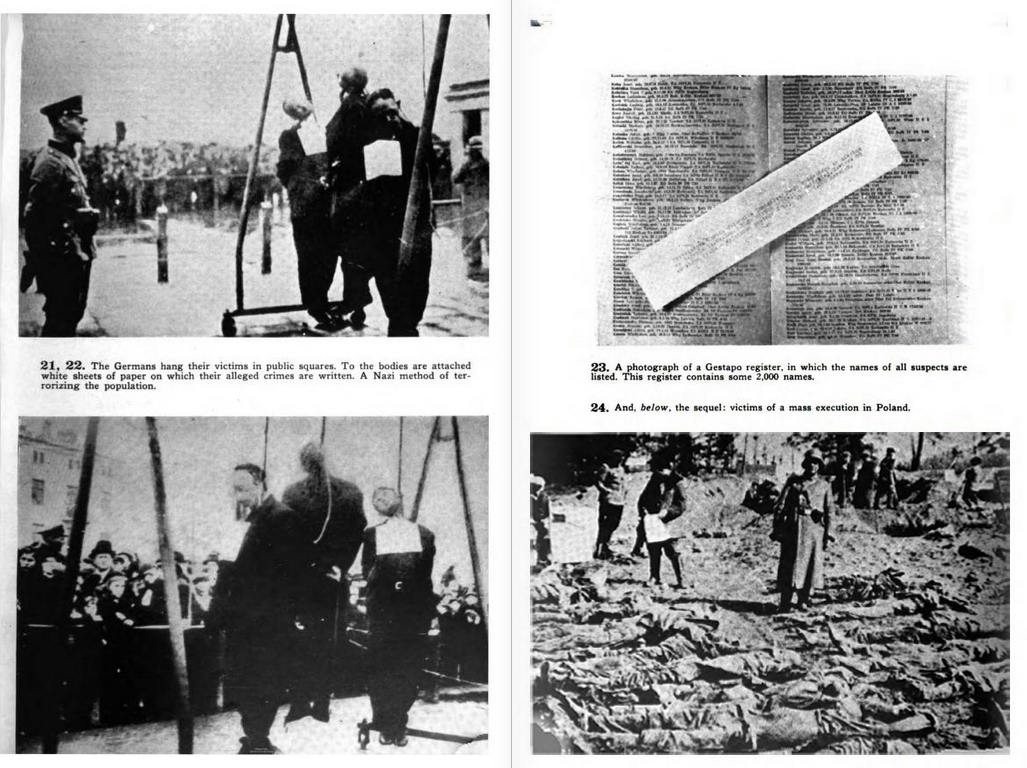
Photos from The Black Book of Poland, published in London in 1942 by Polish government-in-exile

In the first three months of war, from the fall of 1939 until the spring of 1940, some 60,000 former government officials, military officers in reserve, landowners, clergy, and members of the Polish intelligentsia were executed region by region in the so-called Intelligenzaktion, including over 1,000 POWs. Summary executions of Poles were conducted by all German forces without exception including, Wehrmacht, Gestapo, the SS and Selbstschutz in violation of international agreements. The mass murders were a part of the secretive Operation Tannenberg, an early measure of the Generalplan Ost settler colonization. Polish Christians as well as Jews were either murdered and buried in hastily dug mass graves or sent to prisons and German concentration camps. "Whatever we find in the shape of an upper class in Poland will be liquidated," Hitler had ordered. In the Intelligenzaktion Pommern, a regional action in Pomeranian Voivodeship 23,000 Poles were killed. It was continued by the German AB-Aktion operation in Poland in the mid-1940s. The AB-Aktion saw the massacre of Lwów professors and the executions of about 1,700 Poles in the Palmiry forest. Several thousand civilian victims were executed or imprisoned. The Einsatzgruppen were also responsible for the indiscriminate murder of Jews and Poles during the 1941 German invasion of the Soviet Union.

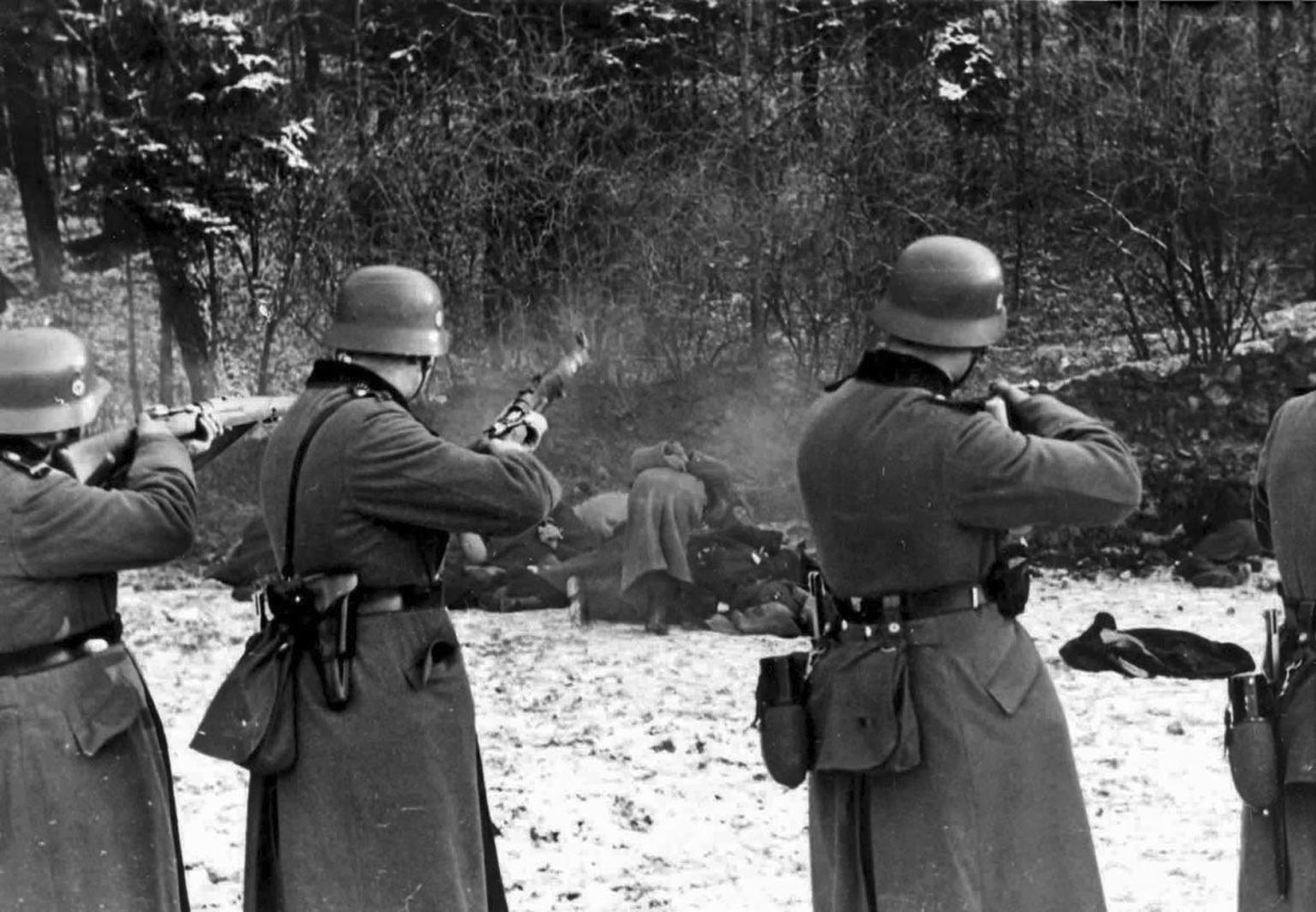
A mass execution of 56 hostages in Bochnia near Kraków, 18 December 1939. In Palmiry, about 1,700 Poles were murdered in secret executions between 7 December 1939, and 17 July 1941.

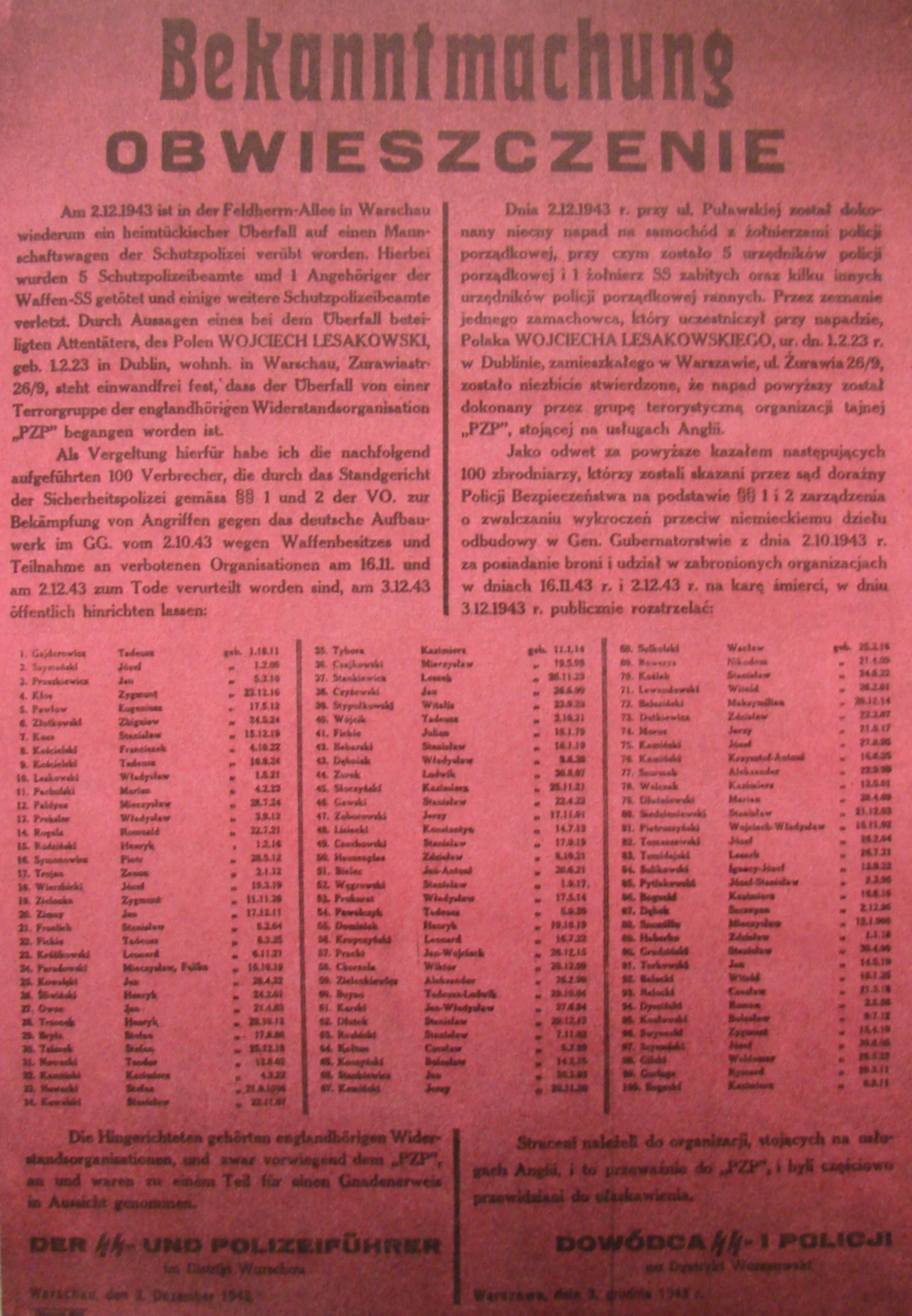
Announcement of execution of 100 Polish hostages as revenge for assassination of 5 German policemen and 1 SS-man by Armia Krajowa (quote: a Polish "terrorist organization in British service"). Warsaw, 2 October 1943.

Communities were collectively punished for the purported Polish counter-attacks against the invading German troops. Mass executions of hostages were conducted almost every day during the Wehrmacht advance across Poland. The locations, dates and numbers include: Starogard (2 September), 190 Poles, 40 of them Jews; Swiekatowo (3 September), 26 Poles; Wieruszów (3 September), 20 Poles all Jews. On 4 September 1939 the 42nd Infantry Regiment (46th Infantry Division) committed the Częstochowa massacre with 1,140 citizens or more (150 of them Jews) murdered in wild shooting actions in several city locations. (Note: "Executions took place in front and in the courtyard of the townhall; behind the offices of the Wydzial Techniczny Zarzadu Miejskiego; at the New Market Square (currently Daszynski Square); inside the Church of sw. Zygmunta; at Strazacka street in front of the Brass' Works; and at the Cathedral Square as well as inside the Cathedral". Quote from "Tablica przy ul. Olsztynskiej upamietniajaca ofiary 'krwawego poniedzialku'" [Plaque at Olsztynska Street commemorating Bloody Monday in Czestochowa]. Virtualny Sztetl. Museum of the History of Polish Jews.. See also Gilbert 1990, p. 87.) In Imielin (4–5 September), 28 Poles were murdered; in Kajetanowice (5 September), 72 civilians were massacred in revenge for two German horses killed by German friendly fire; Trzebinia (5 September), 97 Polish citizens; Piotrków (5 September), Jewish section of the city was set on fire; Będzin (8 September), two hundred civilians burned to death; about 300 were shot to death in Turek (9 September) Klecko (9–10 September), three hundred citizens executed; Mszadla (10 September), 153 Poles; Gmina Besko (11 September), 21 Poles; Kowalewice (11 September), 23 Poles; Pilica (12 September); 36 Poles, 32 of them Jewish; Olszewo (13 September), 13 people (half of the village) from Olszewo and 10 from nearby Pietkowo including women and children stabbed by bayonets, shot, blown up by grenades, and burned alive in a barn; Mielec (13 September), 55 Jews burned to death; Piątek (13 September), 50 Poles, seven of them Jews. On 14–15 September about 900 Polish Jews in parallel shooting actions in Przemyśl and in Medyka. Roughly at the same time, in Solec (14 September), 44 Poles killed; soon thereafter in Chojnice, 40 Polish citizens; Gmina Klecko, 23 Poles; Bądków, 22 Poles; Dynów, two hundred Polish Jews. Public executions continued well beyond September, including in municipalities such as Wieruszów County, Gmina Besko, Gmina Gidle, Gmina Klecko, Gmina Ryczywół, and Gmina Siennica, among others.

In and around Bydgoszcz, about 10,000 Polish civilians were murdered in the first four months of the occupation (see Bloody Sunday, and the Valley of Death). German Army and Selbstschutz paramilitary units composed of ethnic German Volksdeutsche also participated.

The Nazis took hostages by the thousands at the time of the invasion and throughout their occupation of Poland. Hostages were selected from among the most prominent citizens of occupied cities and villages: priests, professors, doctors, lawyers, as well as leaders of economic and social organizations and the trade unions. Often, however, they were chosen at random from all segments of society and for every German killed a group of between 50 and 100 Polish civilians were executed.

== Ethnic cleansing through forced expulsion ==
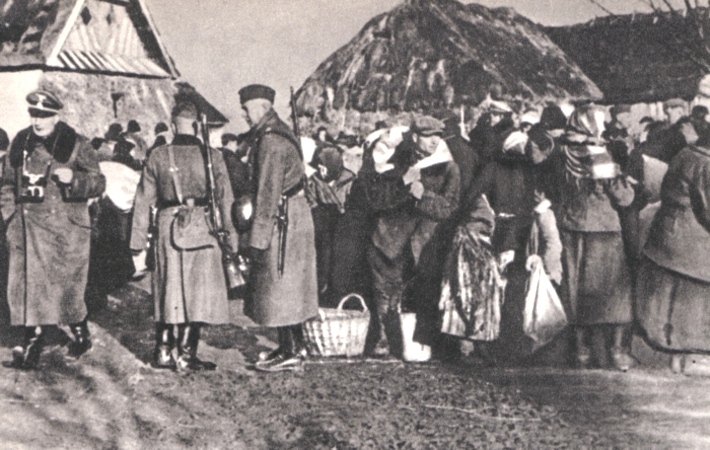
Expulsion of Poles from villages in the Zamość Region by German SS soldiers, December 1942

Germany planned to completely remove the indigenous population of Poland beginning with the newly created Reichsgau Wartheland territory in 1939. According to the Lebensraum aim and ideology, formerly Polish lands were to be taken over by the German military and civilian settlers including Eastern European Volksdeutsche. The "Germanizing" of occupied territories by the Reich was repeatedly condemned by Nuremberg Tribunal which stated that the practice of expelling civilians was "not only in defiance of well-established rules of international law, but in complete disregard of the elementary dictates of humanity." During the occupation of Poland, the number of Poles evicted by the German authorities from their homes is estimated at 2,478,000. Up to 928,000 Poles were ethnically cleansed to make way for the foreign colonists.

The number of displaced Polish nationals in four years of German occupation included: from Warthegau region 630,000 Poles; from Silesia 81,000; from Pomerania 124,000; from Bialystok District 28,000; and from Ciechanów district 25,000 Poles and Jews. In the so-called "wild expulsions" from Pomerelia, some 30,000 to 40,000 Polish people were evicted, and from General Government (to German "reservations") some 171,000 Poles and Jews. To create new colonial latifundia, 42% of annexed farms were demolished. Some 3 million Poles were sent to perform slave labor in the Reich. Additional 500,000 ethnic Poles were deported from Warsaw after the Warsaw uprising on top of 180,000 civilian casualties.

The expulsions were carried out so abruptly that the ethnic Germans resettled from Eastern Galicia, Volhynia and Romanian Bukovina were taking over Polish homes with half-eaten meals on tables and unmade beds where small children had been sleeping at the time of expulsions. Members of Hitler Youth and the League of German Girls were assigned the task of overseeing evictions to ensure that the Poles left behind most of their belongings for the use of the settlers. Himmler promised to eventually deport all Poles to Russia. He envisioned their ultimate end by exposure, malnutrition and overwork possibly in the Pripet Marshes where all Poles were to die during the cultivation of the marshy swamps. Plans for the mass transportation and possible creation of slave labor camps for up to 20 million Poles were also made.

== Polish Resistance ==
The best example of Polish resistance, not aimed at hurting the Germans or achieving political aims but at protecting the Poles, was the Zamość Uprising. It was a rare situation where the politically anticommunist Home Army, politically neutral Peasants' Battalions, communist People's Guard, and Soviet Partisans all worked together to protect the Poles from German abuses, mainly forced expulsion, and from mass murder carried out by the Ukrainian Insurgent Army on Polish people. The Uprising greatly slowed the German expulsion of Poles and the area's colonization with Germans. The Germans went so far as to create a buffer zone of villages populated by ethnic Ukrainians friendly to the Germans. The Polish peasants were reluctant to join the armed resistance, but were forced to protect themselves.

== Camps and ghettos ==
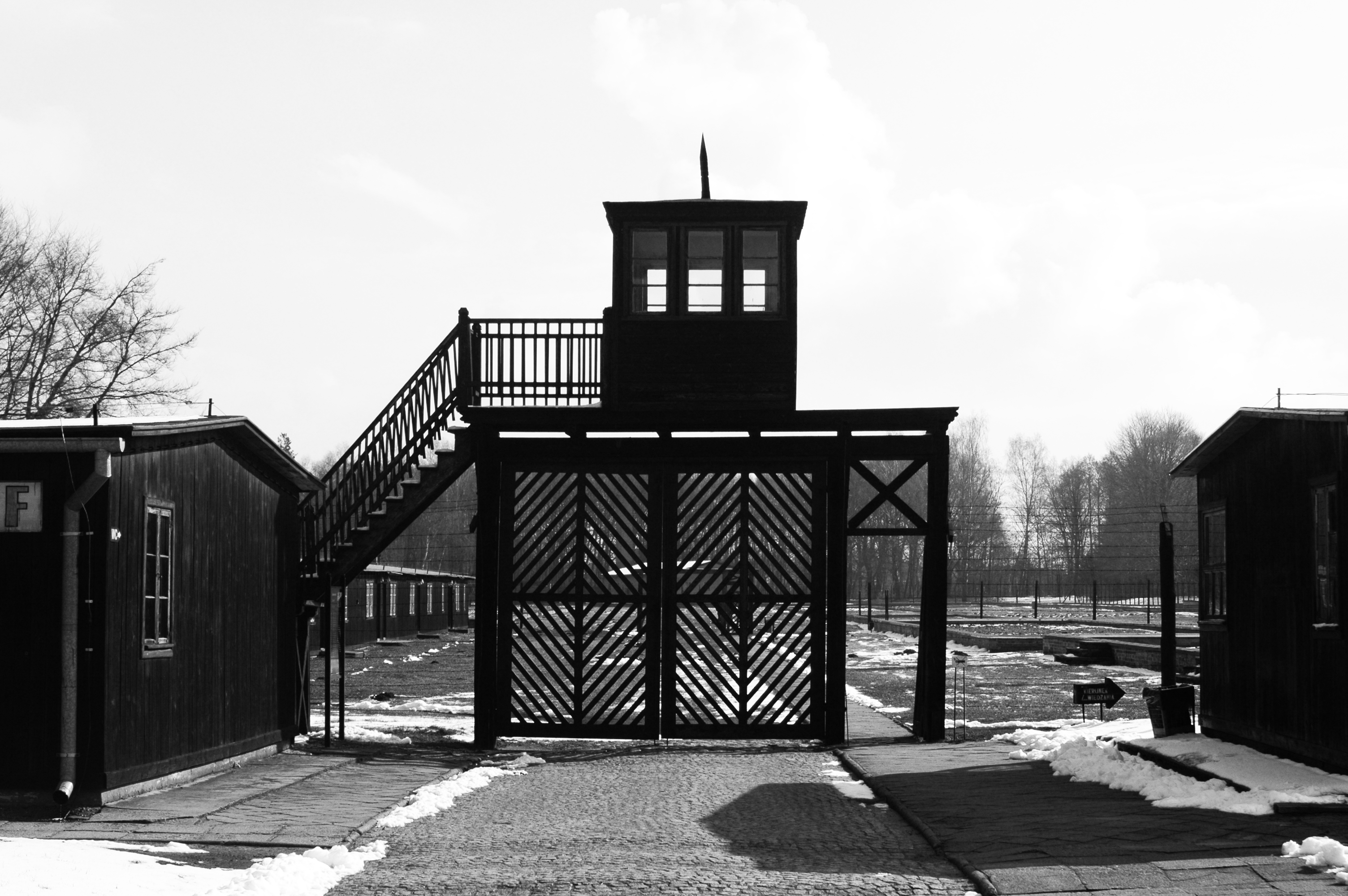
Stutthof concentration camp set up in September 1939; the first Nazi facility of its kind built outside of Germany; eventually 65,000 Polish prisoners were murdered in the camp.

Almost immediately following the invasion, both Germany and the Soviet Union began setting up camps in occupied Poland, which included POW camps for some 230,672 Polish soldiers captured during the September campaign of 1939. Within a short period of time, the German zone of partitioned Poland became a virtual prison-island with more than 430 complexes of state organized terror. It is estimated that some 5 million Polish citizens went through them while serving the German war economy. The Occupation of Poland by Nazi Germany and the Soviet Union began in September 1939. The majority of 50,000 Poles imprisoned at Mauthausen-Gusen were mostly murdered in Gusen; 150,000 at Auschwitz, 20,000 at Sachsenhausen, 40,000 at Gross-Rosen; 17,000 at Neuengamme and 10,000 at Dachau. About 17,000 Polish women were murdered at Ravensbrück. A major concentration camp complex at Stutthof (east of Gdańsk), was launched no later than 2 September 1939 and existed until the end of the war with 39 subcamps. It is estimated that 65,000 Poles were murdered there. The total number of Polish nationals who were murdered in the camps, prisons and places of detention inside and outside Poland exceeds 1,286,000. There were special camps for children such as the Potulice concentration camp, the Kinder-KZ Litzmannstadt for Polish boys, and the forced-labour camp for Polish girls at Dzierżązna (Dzierzazna).

Auschwitz became the main concentration camp for Poles on 14 June 1940. By March 1941, 10,900 prisoners were registered at the camp, most of them Gentile Poles. In September 1941, 200 ailing Polish prisoners along with 650 Soviet POWs, were murdered in the first gassing experiments with Zyklon-B. Beginning in 1942, Auschwitz's prisoner population became much more diverse, as Jews and other "enemies of the state" from all over German-occupied Europe were deported to the expanding camp. Franciszek Piper, the chief historian of Auschwitz, estimates that 140,000 to 150,000 ethnic Poles were brought to that camp between 1940 and 1945, and that 70,000 to 75,000 were murdered there as victims of executions, human experimentation, forced starvation and disease.

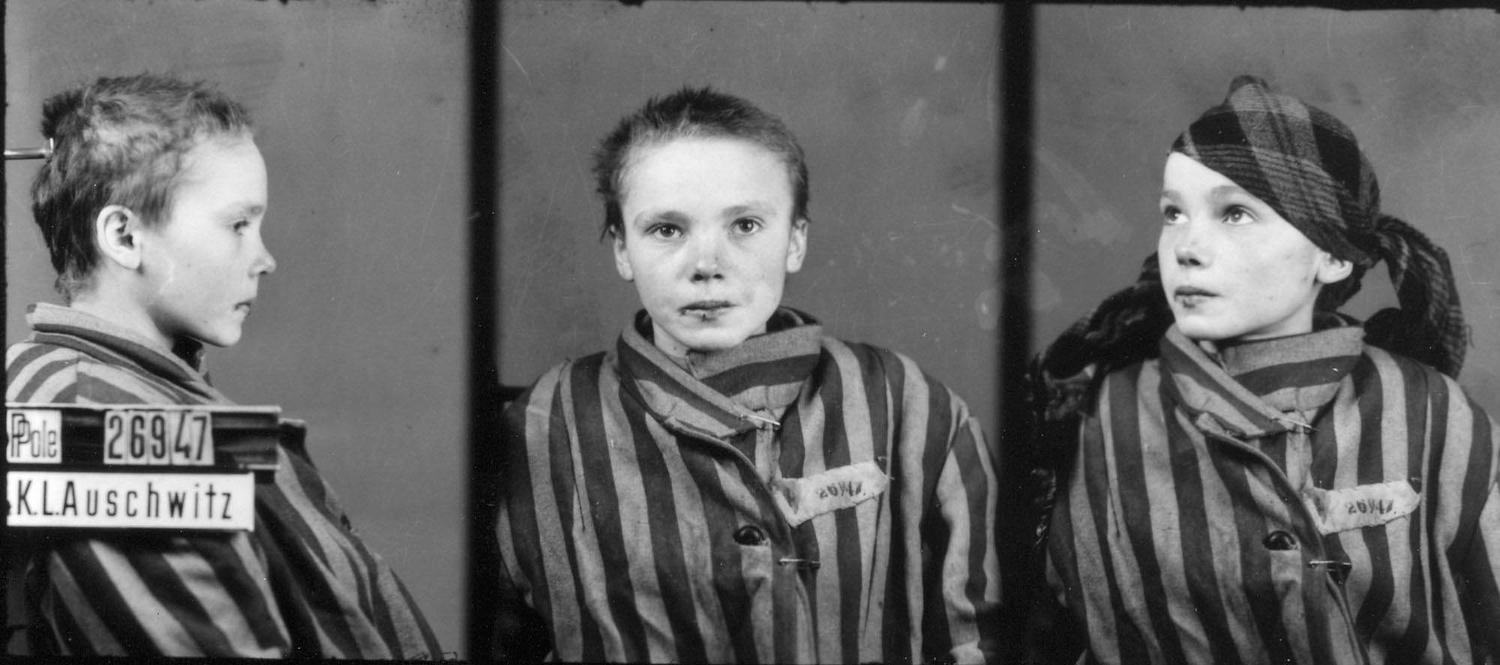
Czesława Kwoka –one of many Polish children murdered in Auschwitz by the Nazis

Some examples of brutality in the camps included human experiments that focused on bone and muscle transplantation, nerve regeneration, wound infection and sulfanilamide. Inmates were finished off with shovels and rifle butts after being shot, with some being buried alive. Mothers were forced to bury their children in dug holes before being executed. Girls and women were raped before being shot. Some perpetrators were tried due to complaints by German soldiers but they were acquitted by Hitler.

Already in 1939, the Germans divided all Poles along the ethnic lines. As part of the expulsion and slave labor program, Jews were singled out and separated from the rest of civilian population in the newly established ghettos. In smaller towns, ghettos served as staging points for mass deportations, while in the urban centers they became instruments of "slow, passive murder" with rampant hunger and dead bodies littering the streets. The ghettos did not correspond to traditional Jewish neighborhoods. The ethnic Poles and members of other groups were ordered to take up residence elsewhere.

The Warsaw Ghetto was the largest ghetto in all of Nazi occupied Europe, with over 400,000 Jews crammed into an area of 1.3 square miles (3.4 km^{2}), or 7.2 persons per room. The Łódź Ghetto was the second largest, holding about 160,000 inmates. By the end of 1941, most of about 3.5 million Polish Jews were already ghettoized, even though the Germans knew that the system was unsustainable; most inmates had no chance of earning their own keep, and no savings left to pay the SS for any further basic food deliveries.

== Forced labour ==
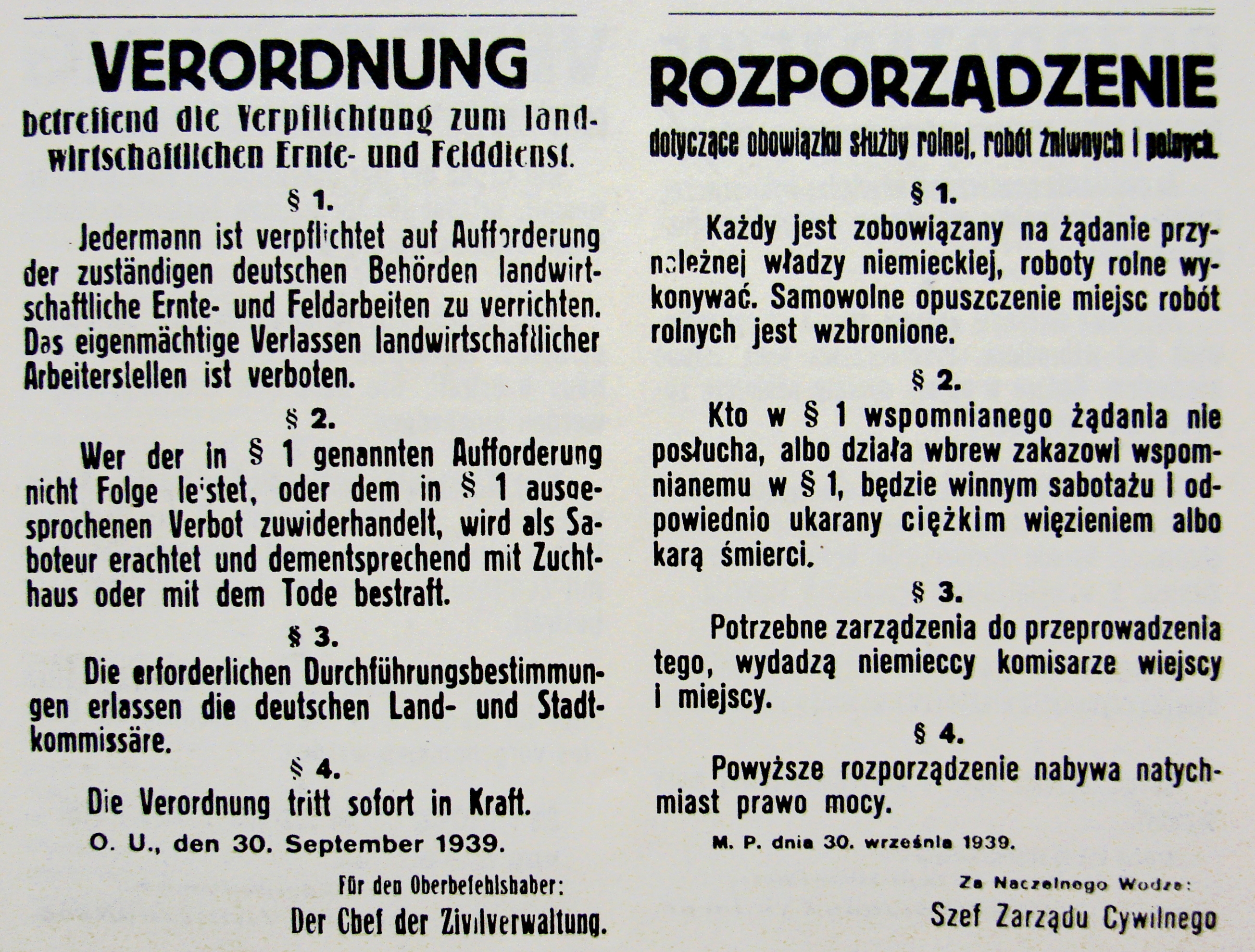
German notice from 30 September 1939 in occupied Poland, warning of the death penalty for refusal to work during harvest

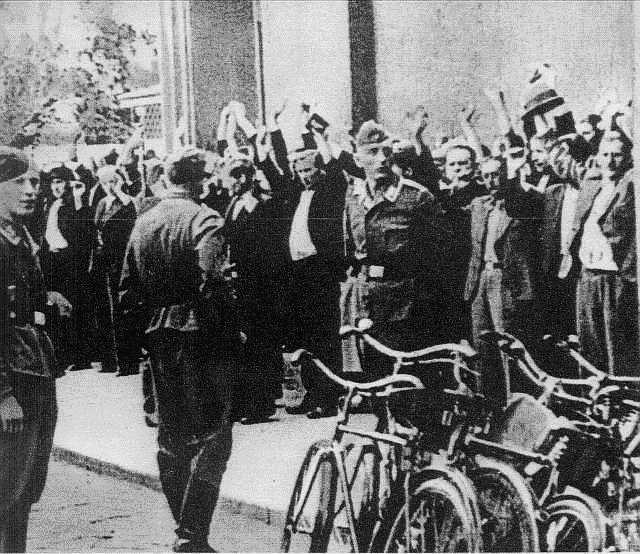
Łapanka – Polish civilian hostages captured by German soldiers on the street, September 1939

In October 1939, the Nazis passed a decree on forced labour for Jews over the age of 12 and Poles over the age of 14 living in the General Government. Between 1939 and 1945, some 3 million Polish citizens were transported to the Reich for slave labor, many of them teenage boys and girls. Although Germany also used forced laborers from Western Europe, Poles and other Eastern Europeans viewed as racially inferior were subjected to intensified discriminatory measures. Polish laborers were compelled to work longer hours for lower than the regular symbolic pay of Western Europeans. They were forced to wear identifying purple tags with "P"s sewn to their clothing, subjected to a curfew, and banned from public transportation. While the treatment of factory workers or farm hands often varied depending on the individual employer, in many cities Poles were forced to live in segregated barracks behind barbed wire. Social relations with Germans outside work were forbidden, and sexual relations ("racial defilement") were considered a capital crime punishable by death. During the war, hundreds of Polish men were executed for their relations with German women. Historian Jan Gross estimated "no more than 15 per cent" of all the Poles who went to Germany did so voluntarily.

Nazis frequently kidnapped women in Polish cities so they could work as prostitutes at German military brothels. Some of these victims were as young as 15 years old.

== Germanization ==
"Not only in Austria, but in Germany as well, so-called national circles were moved by similar false ideas. The Polish policy, demanded by so many, involving a Germanization of the East, was unfortunately based on the same false inference. Here again it was thought that a Germanization of the Polish element could be brought about by a purely linguistic integration with the German element. Here again the result would have been catastrophic; a people of alien race expressing its alien ideas in the German language, compromising the lofty dignity of our own nationality by their own inferiority."

— Adolf Hitler, "Mein Kampf", p. 390

In Reichsgau Wartheland territories of occupied Greater Poland, the Nazi goal was a complete Germanization of the land: i.e. the assimilation politically, culturally, socially and economically into the German Reich. This did not mean the old style Germanization of the inhabitants – by teaching them the language and culture – but rather, the flooding of the Reichsgau with assumed pure Germans aided only by the fraction of those living there previously, most of whom were not ethnically German. Polish researcher Raphael Lemkin stated in 1944:

"Even before the war Hitler envisaged genocide as a means of changing the biological interrelations in Europe in favor of Germany. Hitler's conception of genocide is based not upon cultural but upon biological patterns. He believes that "Germanization can only be carried out with the soil and never with men." ... With respect to the Poles particularly, Hitler expressed the view that it is their soil alone which can and should be profitably Germanized."

— Raphael Lemkin, "Axis Rule in Occupied Europe", Chapter IX: Genocide, pp. 81, 82

But under the Generalplan Ost, a percentage of Slavs in the conquered territories were to be Germanised. Gauleiters Albert Forster and Arthur Greiser reported to Hitler that 10 percent of the Polish population contained "Germanic blood", and were thus suitable for Germanisation. The Reichskommissars in northern and central Russia reported similar figures. Those unfit for Germanisation were to be expelled from the areas marked out for German settlement. In considering the fate of the individual nations, the architects of the Plan decided that it would be possible to Germanise about 50 percent of the Czechs, 35 percent of the Ukrainians and 25 percent of the Belarusians. The remainder would be deported to western Siberia and other regions. In 1941, it was decided that the Polish nation should be completely destroyed in about 10 to 20 years so that it could be re-settled by German colonists.

In order to meet the imaginary targets, Gauleiter Albert Forster, in charge of Reichsgau Danzig-West Prussia, had decided that the whole segments of Polish population are in fact ethnic German, whilst expelling others. This decision led to some two-thirds of the ethnic Polish population of the Gau being defined as "Germans" for the first time in their lives. The Hitler Youth and the League of German Girls sent young people for "Eastern Service", where they trained Polish citizens to speak German.

German Nazis closed elementary schools where Polish was the language of instruction. Streets and cities were renamed (Łódź became Litzmannstadt, etc.). Tens of thousands of Polish enterprises, from large industrial firms to small shops, were seized from their owners. In October 1939, the Nazi propaganda stated Poles, Jews, and Gypsies were subhumans. Signs posted in front of those establishments warned: "Entrance forbidden for Poles, Jews, and dogs." The Nazi regime was less stringent in their treatment of the Kashubians in the Reichsgau Danzig-West Prussia. Everywhere, however, many thousands of people were forced to sign the Deutsche Volksliste, a racial documentation which the Nazis used to identify and give priority to people of German heritage in occupied countries.

=== Crimes against children ===
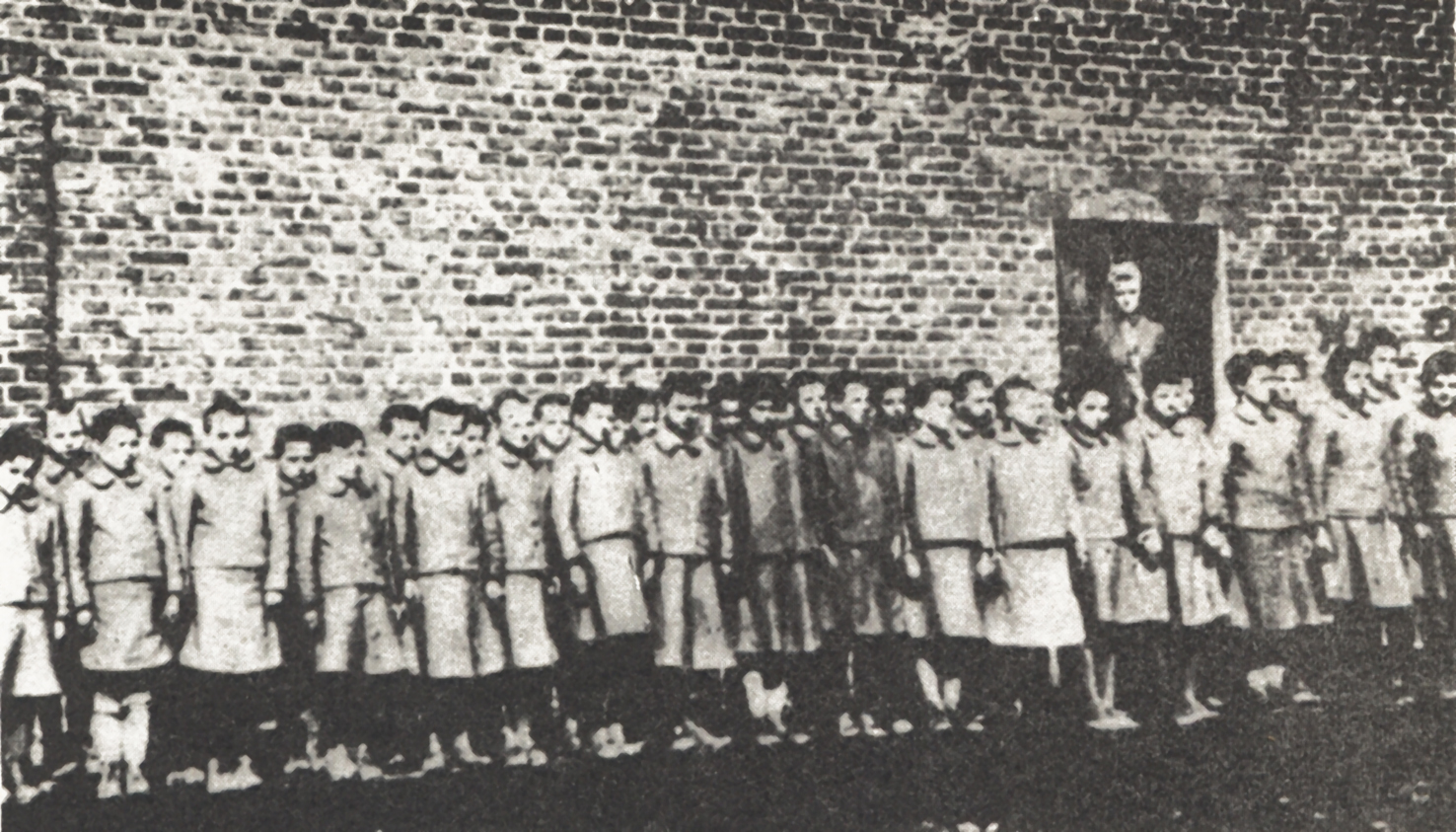
Roll-call for 8-year-old girls at the child labour camp in Dzierżązna, set up as a sub-camp of the concentration camp for Polish children, adjacent to the Łódź Ghetto

At least 200,000 children in occupied Poland were kidnapped by the Nazis to be subjected to forcible germanization (Ausländerkinder-Pflegestätte). These children were screened for "racially valuable traits" and sent to special homes to be Germanized. After racial tests, those deemed suitable, were then placed for adoption if the Germanization was effective, while children who failed the tests were mass murdered in medical experiments, concentration camps or sent to slave labor. After the war, many of the kidnapped children found by Allied forces had been utterly convinced that they were German.

Children of forced workers were brutally mistreated in Nazi birthing centres for foreign workers, where thousands of them were murdered outright or through calculated neglect. Many of the mothers who were unable to return to work after giving birth were murdered. A camp for children and teenagers, Polen-Jugendverwahrlager der Sicherheitspolizei in Litzmannstadt, ran from 1943 to 1944 in Łódź, with a sub-camp for girls in Dzierżązna, Łódź Voivodeship.

=== Cultural genocide ===
As part of the Nazi plan to destroy Poland, the Germans engaged in cultural genocide in which they looted and then destroyed libraries, museums, scientific institutes and laboratories as well as national monuments and historic treasures. They closed down all universities, high schools, and engaged in systematic murder of Polish scholars, teachers and priests. Millions of books were burned, including an estimated 80% of all school libraries, and three-quarters of all scientific libraries. Polish children were forbidden from acquiring education beyond the elementary level with the aim that the new generation of Polish leaders could not arise in the future. According to a May 1940 memo from Heinrich Himmler: "The sole goal of this schooling is to teach them simple arithmetic, nothing above the number 500; writing one's name; and the doctrine that it is divine law to obey the Germans. I do not think that reading is desirable." By 1941, the number of children attending elementary school in the General Government was half of the pre-war number. The Poles responded with Tajne Nauczanie (transl. Secret Teaching), a campaign of underground education.

== Indiscriminate executions ==
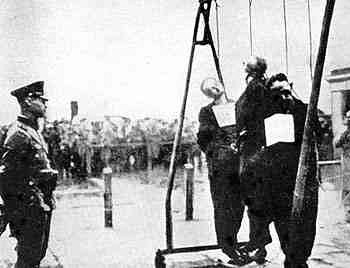
German public execution of Polish civilians, Łódź, The Black Book of Poland, published in London in 1942 by Polish government-in-exile

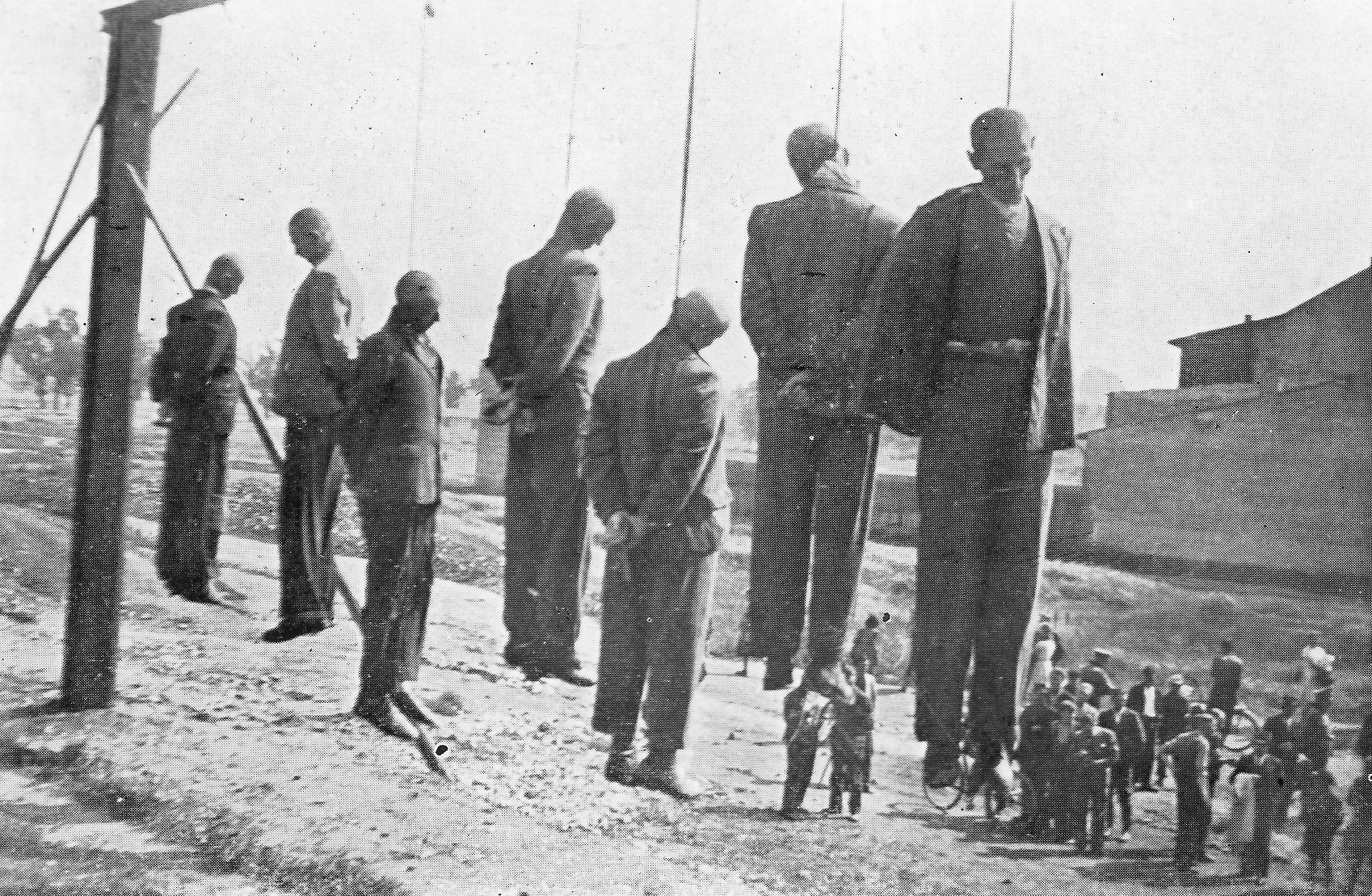
German public execution of Poles, Kraków, 26 June 1942

Ethnic Poles in Poland were targeted by the łapanka policy which German forces utilized to indiscriminately round up civilians off the street. In Warsaw, between 1942 and 1944, there were approximately 400 daily victims of łapanka. It is estimated that tens of thousands of these victims were murdered in mass executions, including an estimated 37,000 people at the Pawiak prison complex run by the Gestapo, and thousands of others murdered in the ruins of the Warsaw Ghetto.

=== Extermination of hospital patients ===
In July 1939, a Nazi secret program called Action T4 was implemented whose purpose was to effect the extermination of psychiatric patients. During the German invasion of Poland, the program was put into practice on a massive scale in the occupied Polish territories. Typically, all patients, accompanied by soldiers from special SS detachments, were transported by trucks to the extermination sites. The first actions of this type took place at a large psychiatric hospital in Kocborowo on 22 September 1939 (Gdańsk region), as well as in Gniezno and in Kościan.

The total number of psychiatric patients murdered by the Nazis in occupied Poland between 1939 and 1945 is estimated to be more than 16,000. An additional 10,000 patients were murdered by starvation. Approximately 100 of the 243 members of the Polish Psychiatric Association met the same fate as their patients.

Execution of patients by firing squad and by revolver included 400 patients of a psychiatric hospital in Chełm on 1 February 1940 and from Owińska. In Pomerania, they were transported to a military fortress in Poznań and gassed with carbon monoxide in the bunkers of Fort VII, including children as well as women whom the authorities classified as Polish prostitutes. Other Owińska hospital patients were gassed in sealed trucks using exhaust fumes. The same method was utilized in the Kochanówka hospital near Łódź, where 840 persons were murdered in 1940, totalling 1,126 victims in 286 clinics.

This was the first "successful" test of the mass murder of Poles using gas. This technique was later perfected on many other psychiatric patients in Poland and in Germany; starting in 1941, the technique was widely employed in the extermination camps. Nazi gas vans were also first used in 1940 to murder mentally ill Polish children.

In 1943, the SS and Police Leader in Poland, Wilhelm Koppe, ordered more than 30,000 Polish patients with tuberculosis to be exterminated as the so-called "health hazard" to the General Government. They were murdered mostly at the Chełmno extermination camp.

== Persecution of the Catholic Church ==
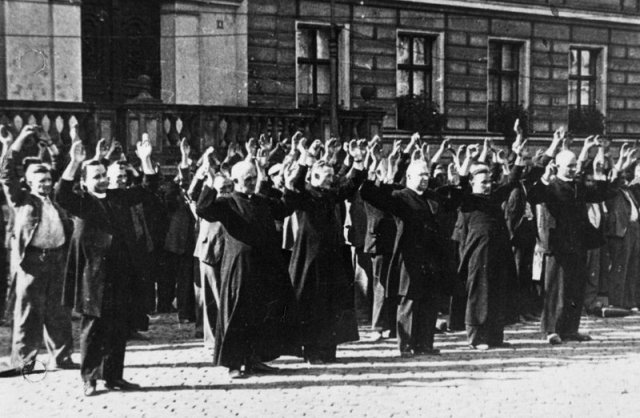
Bydgoszcz 1939 Polish priests and civilians at the Old Market, 9 September 1939

Sir Ian Kershaw wrote that, in Hitler's scheme for the Germanization of Central and Eastern Europe, there would be no place for the Christian Churches.

Historically, the church had been a leading force in Polish nationalism against foreign domination, thus the Nazis targeted clergy, monks and nuns in their terror campaigns—both for their resistance activity and their cultural importance. Of the brief period of military control from 1 September 1939 – 25 October 1939, Davies wrote: "according to one source, 714 mass executions were carried out, and 6,376 people, mainly Catholics, were shot. Other put the death toll in one town alone at 20,000. It was a taste of things to come." According to the Encyclopædia Britannica, 1,811 Polish priests were murdered in Nazi concentration camps.

Nazi policy towards the Church was at its most severe in the territories it annexed to Greater Germany, where the Nazis set about systematically dismantling the Church – arresting its leaders, exiling its clergymen, closing its churches, monasteries and convents. Many clergymen were murdered.

The Catholic Church was suppressed in the annexed territory of Reichsgau Wartheland more harshly than elsewhere. In the Wartheland, regional leader Arthur Greiser, with the encouragement of Reinhard Heydrich and Martin Bormann, launched a severe attack on the Catholic Church. Its properties and funds were confiscated, and lay organisations shut down. Evans wrote that "Numerous clergy, monks, diocesan administrators and officials of the Church were arrested, deported to the General Government, taken off to a concentration camp in the Reich, or simply shot. Altogether some 1,700 Polish priests ended up at Dachau: half of them did not survive their imprisonment." Greiser's administrative chief August Jager had earlier led the effort at Nazification of the Evangelical Church in Prussia. In Poland, he earned the nickname "Kirchen-Jager" (Church-Hunter) for the vehemence of his hostility to the Church.

"By the end of 1941", wrote Evans, "the Polish Catholic Church had been effectively outlawed in the Wartheland. It was more or less Germanized in the other occupied territories, despite an encyclical issued by the Pope as early as 27 October 1939 protesting against this persecution." The Germans also closed seminaries and convents persecuting monks and nuns throughout Poland. In Pomerania, all but 20 of the 650 priests were shot or sent to concentration camps. Between 1939 and 1945, 2,935 members of the Polish clergy (18%) were murdered in concentration camps. In the city of Włocławek, 49% of its Catholic priests were murdered; in Chełmno, 48%. One hundred and eight of them are regarded as blessed martyrs. Among them, Maximilian Kolbe, who volunteered to die at Auschwitz in place of a stranger, was in 1982 canonized as a saint.

== The destruction of Polish Jewry (1941–1943) ==
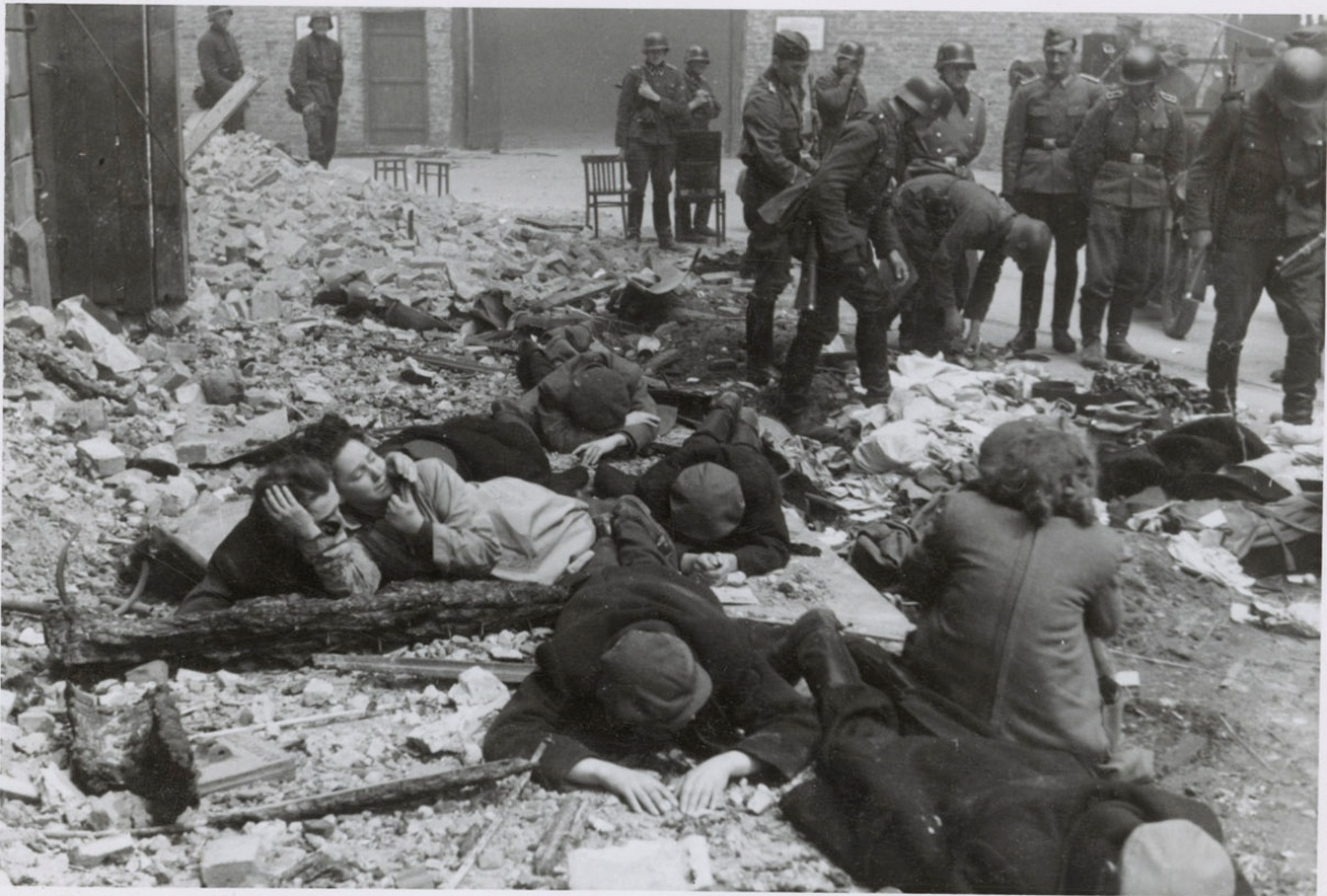
Polish Jews pulled from a bunker by German troops; Warsaw Ghetto Uprising, 1943

The Holocaust in German-occupied Poland involved the implementation of German Nazi policy of systematic and mostly successful murder of the indigenous Polish Jewish population, whom the Nazis regarded as "subhuman" (Untermenschen). Between the 1939 invasion of Poland, and the end of World War II, over 90% of Polish Jewry was murdered. Six extermination camps (Auschwitz, Belzec, Chełmno, Majdanek, Sobibor and Treblinka) were established in which the mass murder of millions of Polish Jews and various other groups, was carried out between 1942 and 1944. The camps were designed and operated by Nazi Germans and there were no Polish guards at any of them. Of Poland's prewar Jewish population of 3.5 million, only about 50,000–120,000 Jews survived the war.

== 1944 destruction of Warsaw ==
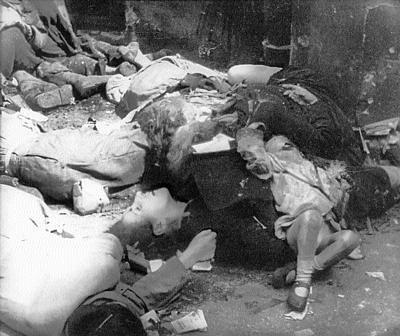
Polish civilians murdered by German SS troops, during the Warsaw Uprising, August 1944

During the suppression of the 1944 Warsaw Uprising, German forces committed many atrocities against Polish civilians, following the order by Hitler to level the city. The most notorious massacre took place in Wola where, at the beginning of August 1944, between 40 and 50,000 civilians (men, women, and children) were shot, sexually assaulted and tortured by the Einsatzkommando of the Sicherheitspolizei under Heinz Reinefarth's command and the amnestied German criminals from Dirlewanger. Other similar massacres took place in the areas of Śródmieście (City Centre), Stare Miasto (Old Town) and Marymont districts. In Ochota, an orgy of civilian killings, rape and looting was carried out by Russian collaborators of RONA. After the fall of Stare Miasto, during the beginning of September, 7,000 seriously wounded hospital patients were executed or burnt alive, often with the medical staff caring for them. Similar atrocities took place later in the Czerniaków district and after the fall of Powiśle and Mokotów districts.

Until the end of September 1944, Polish resistance fighters were not considered by Germans as combatants; thus, when captured, they were summarily executed. One hundred and sixty-five thousand surviving civilians were sent to labour camps, and 50,000 were shipped to concentration camps, while the ruined city was systematically demolished. Neither Reinefarth nor Erich von dem Bach-Zelewski were ever tried for their crimes committed during the suppression of the uprising. (The Polish request for extradition of amnestied Wilhelm Koppe from Germany was also refused.)

== See also ==
- Anti-Polish sentiment
- Bialystok Ghetto Uprising
- Chronicles of Terror
- Consequences of Nazism
- Czestochowa Ghetto Uprising
- Generalplan Ost
- Genocide
- German-occupied Europe
- German retribution against Poles who helped Jews
- Gestapo-NKVD Conferences 1939-1940
- Ghetto Litzmannstadt
- Hans Frank
- Intelligenzaktion
- Intelligenzaktion Pommern
- The Holocaust in occupied Poland
- Gas van
- Holocaust victims
- Kraków Ghetto
- Medallions by Zofia Nalkowska
- Nazi crime
- Polish areas annexed by Nazi Germany
- Polish decrees
- Polish resistance movement in World War II
- Polish Underground State
- Porajmos (the "Romani genocide" or "Romani holocaust")
- Racial policy of Nazi Germany
- Sexual slavery by Germany during World War II
- Soviet repressions of Polish citizens (1939–1946)
- Special Prosecution Book-Poland (Sonderfahndungsbuch Polen)
- Territorial changes of Poland
- Valley of Death (Bydgoszcz)
- War rape by German forces during World War II
- World War II casualties of Poland
- Zdzięcioł Ghetto
