= Starosta (surname) =

Starosta (Czech/Slovak feminine: Starostová) is a Czech, Polish, and Slovak surname. Notable people with this surname include:

- Ben Starosta (born 1987), Polish-English footballer
- Jaroslav Starosta (1937–2022), Czech rower
- Jiří Starosta (1923–2012), Czech football manager
- Marysia Starosta (born 1981), Polish singer
- Monika Starosta (born 1972), Polish tennis player
- Ondřej Starosta (born 1979), Czech basketball player
- Sławomir Starosta (born 1965), Polish LGBT activist
- Stanley Starosta (1939–2002), American linguist
- Tomáš Starosta (born 1981), Slovak ice hockey player
- Waldemar Starosta (born 1961), Polish politician
