= Piotrowo, Oborniki County =

Piotrowo
- Village
- Location within Poland
- Coordinates: 52°50′N 16°45′E
- Country: Poland
- Voivodeship: Greater Poland
- County: Oborniki
- Gmina: Ryczywół
- Time zone: UTC+1 (CET)
  - Summer (DST): UTC+2 (CEST)
- Vehicle registration: POB

Piotrowo [pjɔˈtrɔvɔ] is a village in the administrative district of Gmina Ryczywół, within Oborniki County, Greater Poland Voivodeship, in west-central Poland.

== History ==
Part of the region of Greater Poland, i.e. the cradle of the Polish state, the area formed part of Poland since its establishment in the 10th century. Prussia annexed the village in the late-18th-century Partitions of Poland. It was regained by Poles in 1807 and included within the short-lived Duchy of Warsaw, and after the duchy's dissolution in 1815, the village was reannexed by Prussia, and was also part of Germany from 1871. Following World War I, Poland regained independence and control of the village.

During the joint German-Soviet invasion of Poland which started World War II in September 1939, the village was invaded by Germany. The local forest was the site of a massacre of Poles committed by members of the German Selbstschutz and Jungdeutsche Partei on 17–18 September 1939. 14 badly wounded Polish inhabitants of nearby villages were killed with shovels in the massacre (see also Nazi crimes against the Polish nation).
