= Łopiszewo =

- Village
- Location within Poland
- Coordinates: 52°48′46″N 16°48′49″E
- Country: Poland
- Voivodeship: Greater Poland
- County: Oborniki
- Gmina: Ryczywół
- Time zone: UTC+1 (CET)
  - Summer (DST): UTC+2 (CEST)
- Vehicle registration: POB

Łopiszewo [wɔpiˈʂɛvɔ] is a village in the administrative district of Gmina Ryczywół, within Oborniki County, Greater Poland Voivodeship, in west-central Poland.

During the German invasion of Poland, which started World War II, the Germans murdered six Poles in the village on 14 and 21 September 1939 (see Nazi crimes against the Polish nation).
