= Krężoły =

Krężoły may refer to the following places:

- Krężoły, Greater Poland Voivodeship (west-central Poland)
- Krężoły, Kuyavian-Pomeranian Voivodeship (north-central Poland)
- Krężoły, Świętokrzyskie Voivodeship (south-central Poland)
- Krężoły, Lubusz Voivodeship (west Poland)
