= Lipa-Wojciechowo =

- Settlement
- Location within Poland
- Coordinates: 52°44′16″N 16°47′42″E
- Country: Poland
- Voivodeship: Greater Poland
- County: Oborniki
- Gmina: Ryczywół

Lipa-Wojciechowo (Polish pronunciation: [ˈlipa vɔjt͡ɕɛˈxɔvɔ]) is a settlement in the administrative district of Gmina Ryczywół, within Oborniki County, Greater Poland Voivodeship, in west-central Poland.
