= Gościejewo Leśne =

- Settlement
- Location within Poland
- Coordinates: 52°49′23″N 16°53′19″E
- Country: Poland
- Voivodeship: Greater Poland
- County: Oborniki
- Gmina: Ryczywół

Gościejewo Leśne (Polish pronunciation: [ɡɔɕt͡ɕɛˈjɛvɔ ˈlɛɕnɛ]) is a settlement in the administrative district of Gmina Ryczywół, within Oborniki County, Greater Poland Voivodeship, in west-central Poland.
