= Gościejewko =

- Village
- Location within Poland
- Coordinates: 52°48′N 16°54′E
- Country: Poland
- Voivodeship: Greater Poland
- County: Oborniki
- Gmina: Ryczywół

Gościejewko (Polish pronunciation: [ɡɔɕt͡ɕɛˈjɛfkɔ]) is a village in the administrative district of Gmina Ryczywół, within Oborniki County, Greater Poland Voivodeship, in west-central Poland.
