= Piłka-Młyn =

- Settlement
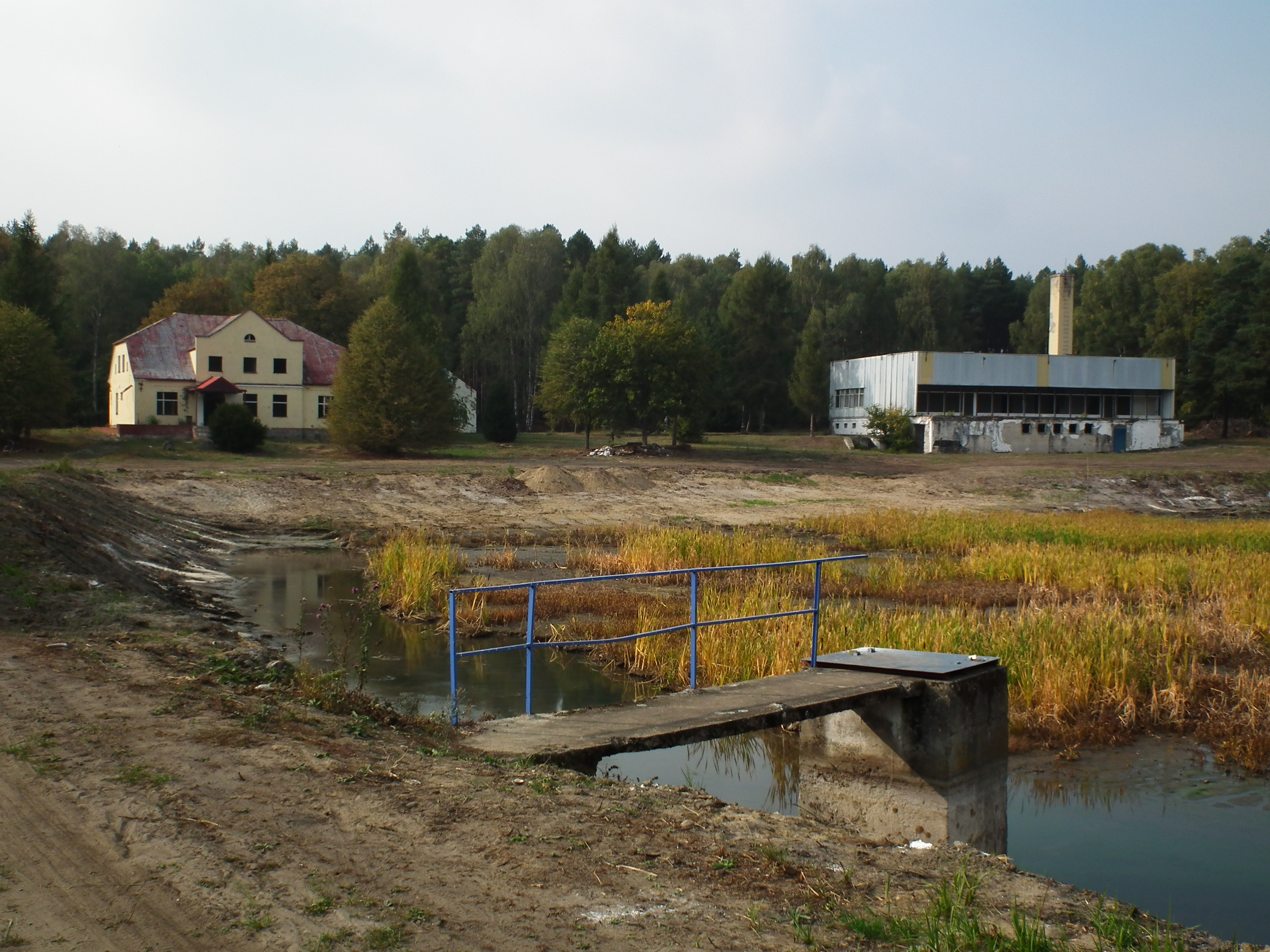
- Forest in Pilka Mlyn

- Location within Poland
- Coordinates: 52°43′02″N 16°51′14″E
- Country: Poland
- Voivodeship: Greater Poland
- County: Oborniki
- Gmina: Ryczywół

Piłka-Młyn [ˈpiu̯ka ˈmwɨn] is a settlement in the administrative district of Gmina Ryczywół, within Oborniki County, Greater Poland Voivodeship, in west-central Poland.
