= Chlebowo, Oborniki County =

Chlebowo
- Village
- Location within Poland
- Coordinates: 52°45′N 16°46′E
- Country: Poland
- Voivodeship: Greater Poland
- County: Oborniki
- Gmina: Ryczywół

Chlebowo ([xlɛˈbɔvɔ]; German: Schleborg) is a village in the administrative district of Gmina Ryczywół, within Oborniki County, Greater Poland Voivodeship, in west-central Poland.
