= Dąbrówka Ludomska =

- Village
- Location within Poland
- Coordinates: 52°44′26″N 16°51′14″E
- Country: Poland
- Voivodeship: Greater Poland
- County: Oborniki
- Gmina: Ryczywół

Dąbrówka Ludomska [dɔmˈbrufka luˈdɔmska] is a village in the administrative district of Gmina Ryczywół, within Oborniki County, Greater Poland Voivodeship, in west-central Poland.
