= Waldemar Starosta =

Polish politician

member of Sejm 2005-2007
- In office 25 September 2005 – 2007

Personal details
- Born: 14 July 1961 (age 64) Lipa, Oborniki County
- Party: Samoobrona

Waldemar Henryk Starosta (born 14 July 1961 in Lipa, Oborniki County) is a Polish politician. He was elected to Sejm on 25 September 2005, getting 8391 votes in 8 Zielona Góra district as a candidate from the Samoobrona Rzeczpospolitej Polskiej list.

== See also ==
- Members of Polish Sejm 2005-2007
