= Igrzyna =

- Settlement
- Location within Poland
- Coordinates: 52°51′5″N 16°48′30″E
- Country: Poland
- Voivodeship: Greater Poland
- County: Oborniki
- Gmina: Ryczywół

Igrzyna [iˈɡʐɨna] is a settlement in the administrative district of Gmina Ryczywół, within Oborniki County, Greater Poland Voivodeship, in west-central Poland.
