= Orłowo, Greater Poland Voivodeship =

Orłowo
- Village
- Location within Poland
- Coordinates: 52°46′30″N 16°47′16″E
- Country: Poland
- Voivodeship: Greater Poland
- County: Oborniki
- Gmina: Ryczywół
- Population: 160

Orłowo [ɔrˈwɔvɔ] is a village in the administrative district of Gmina Ryczywół, within Oborniki County, Greater Poland Voivodeship, in west-central Poland.
