= Lipa-Bagna =

- Settlement
- Location within Poland
- Coordinates: 52°43′40″N 16°46′36″E
- Country: Poland
- Voivodeship: Greater Poland
- County: Oborniki
- Gmina: Ryczywół

Lipa-Bagna [ˈlipa ˈbaɡna] is a settlement in the administrative district of Gmina Ryczywół, within Oborniki County, Greater Poland Voivodeship, in west-central Poland.
