= Łaszczewiec =

- Village
- Location within Poland
- Coordinates: 52°46′17″N 16°49′34″E
- Country: Poland
- Voivodeship: Greater Poland
- County: Oborniki
- Gmina: Ryczywół
- Population: 50

Łaszczewiec [waʂˈt͡ʂɛvjɛt͡s] is a village in the administrative district of Gmina Ryczywół, within Oborniki County, Greater Poland Voivodeship, in west-central Poland.
