= Radom, Greater Poland Voivodeship =

Radom
- Village
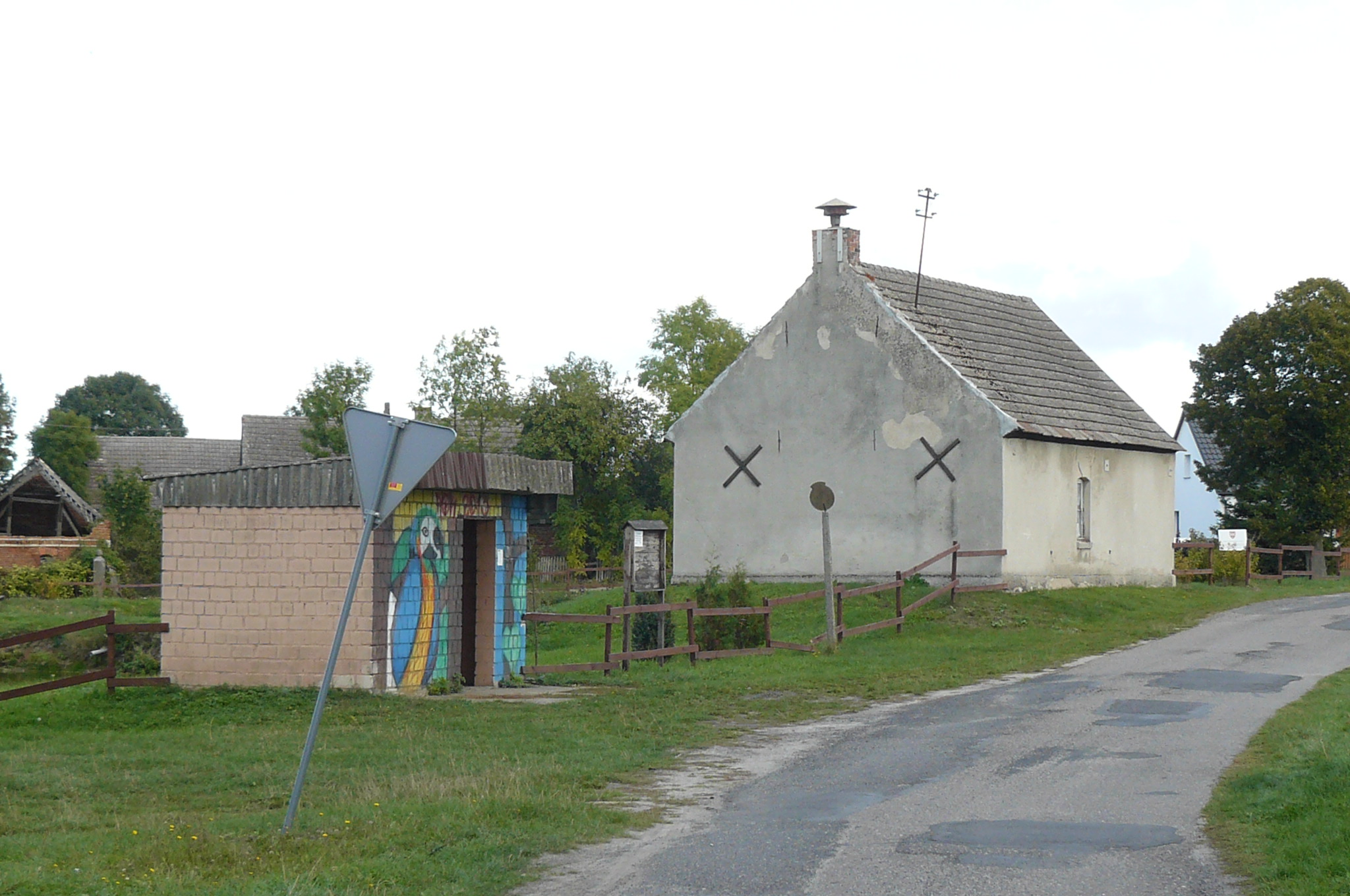
- Street of Radom

- Location within Poland
- Coordinates: 52°51′08″N 16°45′00″E
- Country: Poland
- Voivodeship: Greater Poland
- County: Oborniki
- Gmina: Ryczywół

Radom [ˈradɔm] is a village in the administrative district of Gmina Ryczywół, within Oborniki County, Greater Poland Voivodeship, in west-central Poland.
