= Lipa Nowa =

- Settlement
- Location within Poland
- Coordinates: 52°44′16″N 16°49′37″E
- Country: Poland
- Voivodeship: Greater Poland
- County: Oborniki
- Gmina: Ryczywół

Lipa Nowa [ˈlipa ˈnɔva] is a settlement in the administrative district of Gmina Ryczywół, within Oborniki County, Greater Poland Voivodeship, in west-central Poland.
