= Ludomicko =

- Settlement
- Location within Poland
- Coordinates: 52°45′6″N 16°43′40″E
- Country: Poland
- Voivodeship: Greater Poland
- County: Oborniki
- Gmina: Ryczywół

Ludomicko [ludɔˈmit͡skɔ] is a settlement in the administrative district of Gmina Ryczywół, within Oborniki County, Greater Poland Voivodeship, in west-central Poland.
