= Chmielewo, Greater Poland Voivodeship =

Chmielewo
- Settlement
- Location within Poland
- Coordinates: 52°47′54″N 16°47′46″E
- Country: Poland
- Voivodeship: Greater Poland
- County: Oborniki
- Gmina: Ryczywół

Chmielewo [xmjɛˈlɛvɔ] is a settlement in the administrative district of Gmina Ryczywół, within Oborniki County, Greater Poland Voivodeship, in west-central Poland.
