= Lipa, Oborniki County =

Lipa
- Village
- Location within Poland
- Coordinates: 52°44′N 16°48′E
- Country: Poland
- Voivodeship: Greater Poland
- County: Oborniki
- Gmina: Ryczywół
- Population (approx.): 500

Lipa [ˈlipa] is a village in the administrative district of Gmina Ryczywół, within Oborniki County, Greater Poland Voivodeship, in west-central Poland.

The village has an approximate population of 500.
