= Kinder KZ =

Nazi concentration camp for children in Łódź

Coordinates: 51°47′36″N 19°28′32″E

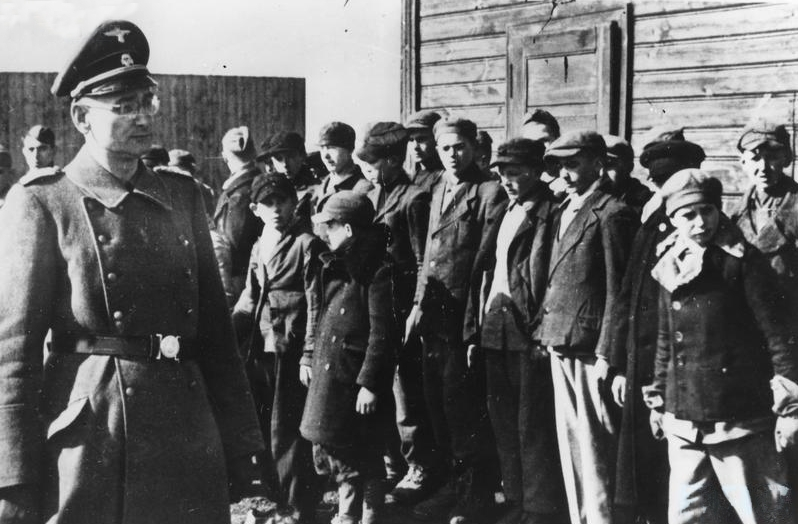
- Boys' roll call at main Łódź children's concentration camp, of which KZ Dzierżązna, for Polish girls as young as eight, was a sub-camp

- Kinder-KZ inside Litzmannstadt Ghetto; map, KZ marked with number 15 (red)

Kinder-KZ Litzmannstadt (German: Polen-Jugendverwahrlager der Sicherheitspolizei in Litzmannstadt, Polish: Prewencyjny Obóz Policji Bezpieczeństwa dla Młodzieży Polskiej w Łodzi, "Child Concentration Camp Łodź") was a Nazi German concentration camp for Polish Christian children in occupied Łodź during World War II, established in December 1942 adjacent to the Litzmannstadt Ghetto where Polish Jews were imprisoned before the Holocaust.

== History ==
Separated from one another only by a high fence made of planks, the children's camp was located within the Ghetto section of the city bordering roughly today's streets of Bracka, Emilii Plater, Gornicza, and Zagajnikowa. The main gate of the camp was located on Przemyslowa Street (Gewerbestrasse). Kinder KZ was run from 1941 to 1945. The prisoners were Polish children of deported Poles from all Polish provinces. The Nazis kept an eye out for Polish children with Nordic racial characteristics, those among them found to be classified as "racially valuable" were sent from here to the German Reich for adoption and Germanisation to be raised as Germans. About 3,000 (between 12,000 and 13,000 according to International Tracing Service) children were forced into passing through the camp. The 1,600 child labourers performed work closely connected with the industrial output of the ghetto, with Jewish instructors. The youngest ones on record were merely two years old, while most of them were aged between 8 and 14.

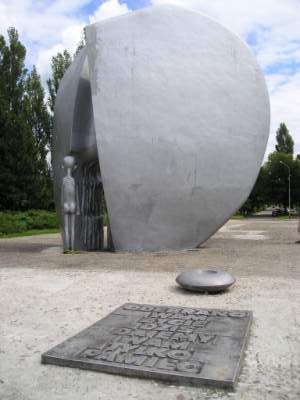
Broken Heart memorial to martyred Łódź children

== Location and layout ==
Having chosen Łódź (Litzmannstadt) for its location, several locations were considered here: the Franciscan monastery in Łagiewniki in Łódź, the school in Cisna near Łódź, the estate in Dzierżązna near Zgierz and the area in the far suburbs in the north-west of the city (today Marianów, in the Bałuty district), at Haidelbeerenweg (now Chlebowa street).

Finally, it was decided to separate the area from the Łódź ghetto in the area of Przemysłowa Street (during the occupation of Gewerbestrasse), which was easiest to acquire. In addition, it was inherently isolated by the fact of its location. Probably a considerable argument was that in the future it could be expanded without major administrative problems.

The desire to hide its existence, raised in some publications, certainly was not an important element of the decision, if it was ever considered. The basic criterion was that it should be easy to obtain and, if necessary, expand the area. When the camp began to function above its main entrance gate from Przemysłowa Street, a large signboard with the full name appeared.

A square was separated from the ghetto between the current streets: Emily Plater - Bracka - Górnicza and the then western wall of the Jewish cemetery at Bracka street (now a fragment of Zagajnikowa street).

The main and only entrance for people from the city (gate) was on ul. Przemysłowa at Bracka Street (there was also a gate from Górnicza Street), hence the post-war name "camp at ul. Industrial". The area of the camp was surrounded by a high wooden crevice fence made by a Jewish construction brigade taken from the ghetto.

According to the assumptions, the camp was to be a place of detention for Polish youth: caught in petty crimes, homeless or whose parents were arrested or executed.

The ordinance of the Reich Security Main Office said that "criminals or neglected children from 8 to 16 years old should be sent to the camp". Initially intended for children and adolescents from 8 to 16 years old, but this limit was soon reduced to 6 years of age, unambiguous information indicates that younger children were also temporarily detained there - from 2 years old.

The first prisoners arrived at the camp on December 11, 1942.

== After the war ==
The camp was liberated by the Red Army on January 19, 1945.

In the first days of the end of the German occupation in Łódź (after January 19, 1945) older children left the camp and went alone to their family homes. Some of the younger did so too, but soon afterwards they returned to the camp, because they could not cope with life outside its fence. Hence, they were taken by the reviving services and charity and care organizations.

In February 1945, an undefined unit of the Red Army was located in the camp. This unit left the place after a few months.

After this episode, their former owners returned to their pre-war houses in the area. Wooden camp buildings created during its construction - mainly large barracks "Haus IX" and "Haus X" - were most likely demolished by the owners (if not by the surrounding population) of the plots on which they stood. Also, probably the first to be liquidated was a 2-meter wooden fence and used for various purposes by local residents.

In the 1960s, a housing estate consisting of 4-storey blocks of flats was erected in and around the former camp as part of a thorough reconstruction of this peripheral area of the city. All wooden buildings were demolished, often in poor technical condition. Also stone, if they collided with the location of new blocks.

=== Preserved buildings of the camp ===
The buildings preserved after the camp liquidation, although more or less rebuilt, were:

- Mostowskiego 19 - a 1-story building; camp quartermaster and food warehouse as well as shoemakers and tailors workshops on part of the floor and attic,
- Mostowskiego 22 - a 1-story building; the so-called "Haus VII" intended for approximately 200 girls located in four 2-room rooms, two on each floor; the supervisors' service room was located on the ground floor,
- Mostowskiego 26 - a 1-story building; children's block; only in August 1943 adapted for the needs of the camp, to accommodate the children of parents arrested under the so-called "The Mosin cause", but with them about 100 children were permanently placed here.
- Przemysłowa 29 and 29a - a one-story building; according to former prisoner J. Witkowski, he was a former karcer, but the analysis of the current buildings shows that there were locksmith and carpentry workshops as well as rooms for an electrician and a camp glazier; Karcer probably at the site of the current shopping pavilion standing next to it.
- Przemysłowa 34 - a 1-story building with a high attic; former camp headquarters; there is an information and commemorative plaque placed in the 70s of the 20th century
- Przemysłowa 48a - a one-story brick building; the so-called "Haus V" (transition block - quarantine), used particularly intensively during the typhus epidemic in 1943 and trachoma in 1944; often up to 300 children were kept here.

In the 1970s, the eastern part of the former camp area, adjacent to the wall of the Jewish cemetery and part of the cemetery, was used to extend Sporna Street, which was given the name of Zagarczyowa Street.

== See also ==
- Subcamp of Kinder-KZ Litzmannstadt at Dzierżązna, Łódź Voivodeship, for imprisonment and child-labor exploitation of Polish girls aged 8–16.

== Bibliography ==
- Józef Witkowski: Hitlerowski Obóz Koncentracyjny dla małoletnich w Łodzi (auf deutsch etwa: Das Hitler-Konzentrationslager für Minderjährige in Lodz). Breslau (Wrocław) 1975
- Hrabar, Roman: Obóz dla dzieci i młodzieży w Łodzi przy ulicy Przemysłowej (auf deutsch etwa: Das Kinder- und Jugendlager in Lodz in der Przemysłowa-Straße). In: Zbrodnie hitlerowskie wobec dzieci i młodzieży Łodzi oraz okręgu łódzkiego, Łódź: 1979
- Michael Hepp: Denn ihrer ward die Hölle. Kinder und Jugendliche im „Jugendverwahrlager Litzmannstadt“. In: Mitteilungen der Dokumentationsstelle zur NS-Sozialpolitik. April 1986, Heft 11/12, S. 49–71, ISSN 0179-4299
- Kempisty, Czesław; Frejtak, Stanisław: Wstępne wyniki badań lekarskich byłych więźniów obozu dla dzieci i młodzieży w Łodzi (Vorläufige Ergebnisse ärztlicher Untersuchungen an ehemaligen Häftlingen des Kinder- und Jugendlagers in Lodz). In: Biuletyn Głównej Komisji Badania Zbrodni Hitlerowskich w Polsce, Bd. 23 (1976)
- Kozłowicz, Tatiana: Karny obóz pracy dla dzieci i młodzieży w Łodzi (Das Strafarbeitslager für Kinder und Jugendliche in Lodz). In: Zbrodnie hitlerowskie na dzieciach i młodzieży polskiej 1939-1945, Warszawa: 1969
- Niemyska-Hessenowa, Maria: Dzieci z „Lagru” w Łodzi (Die Kinder aus dem „Lager” in Lodz). In: Służba społeczna, Nr. 1 (1946)
- Wasiak, Julia: Obóz dla dzieci i młodzieży polskiej przy ul. Przemysłowej (Das Lager für polnische Kinder und Jugendliche in der Przemysłowa-Straße). In: Głowacki, A., Abramowicz, S. (Hrsg.): Obozy hitlerowskie w Łodzi, Łódź: 1998
- Stanczyk, Ewa: Chapter 3. In: Commemorating the Children of World War II in Poland, London: 2019.
