= Dzierżązna, Łódź Voivodeship =

Dzierżązna
- Village
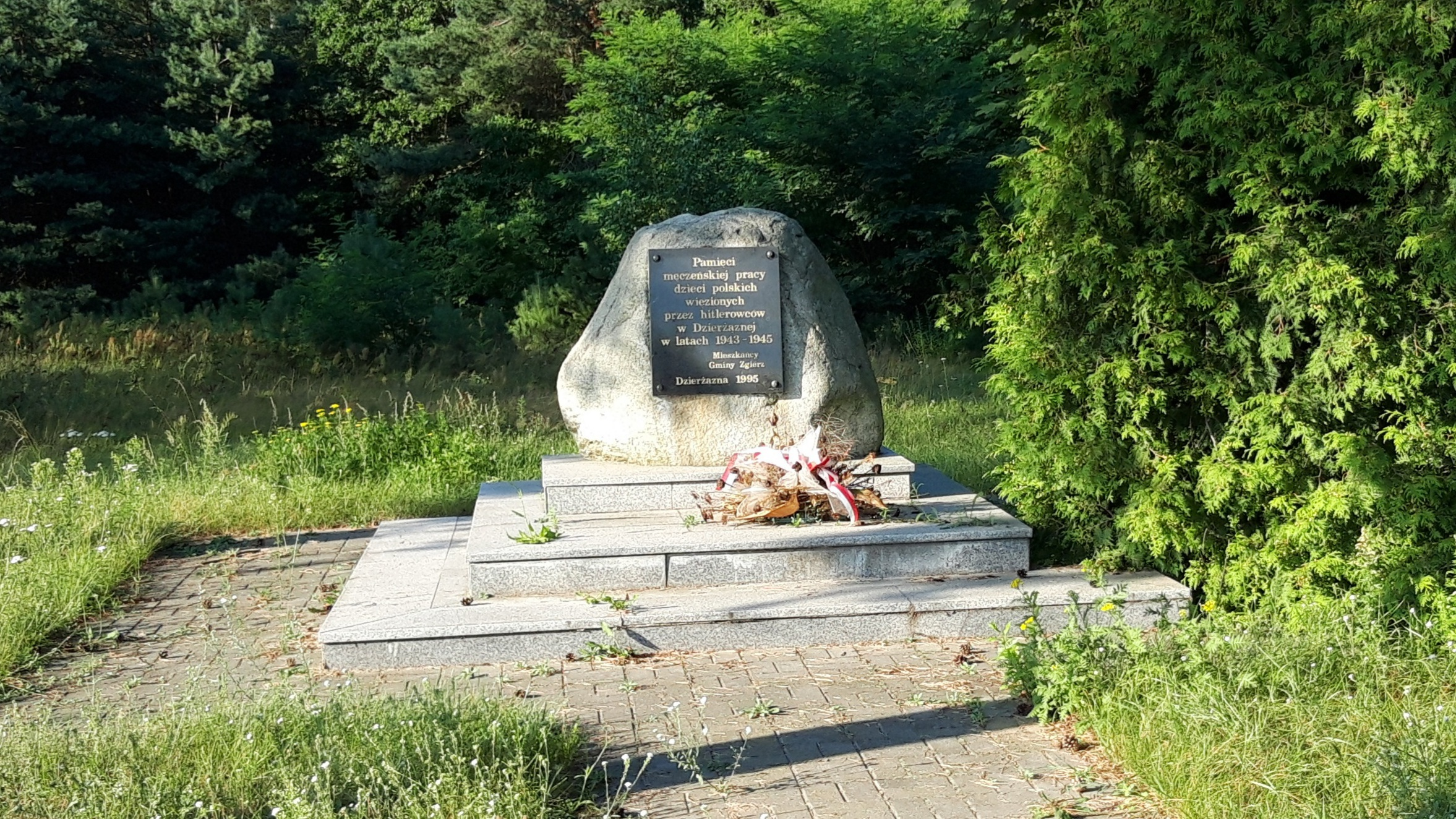

- Location within Poland
- Coordinates: 51°55′N 19°25′E
- Country: Poland
- Voivodeship: Łódź
- County: Zgierz
- Gmina: Zgierz

Dzierżązna pronounced [d͡ʑerˈʐɔ̃zna] is a village in the administrative district of Gmina Zgierz, within Zgierz County, Łódź Voivodeship, in central Poland.

== World War II ==
Before the Nazi German invasion of Poland in 1939, Dzierżązna was the location of a large estate owned by two lawyers from Łódź, with a spacious manor house built by one of them. Poles were evicted within months and the property taken over by a Volksdeutsch Alfred Krinke from Selbstschutz. In 1942 the manor house was appropriated by the German police, who established a concentration camp on premises for Polish girls 8–16 years of age.

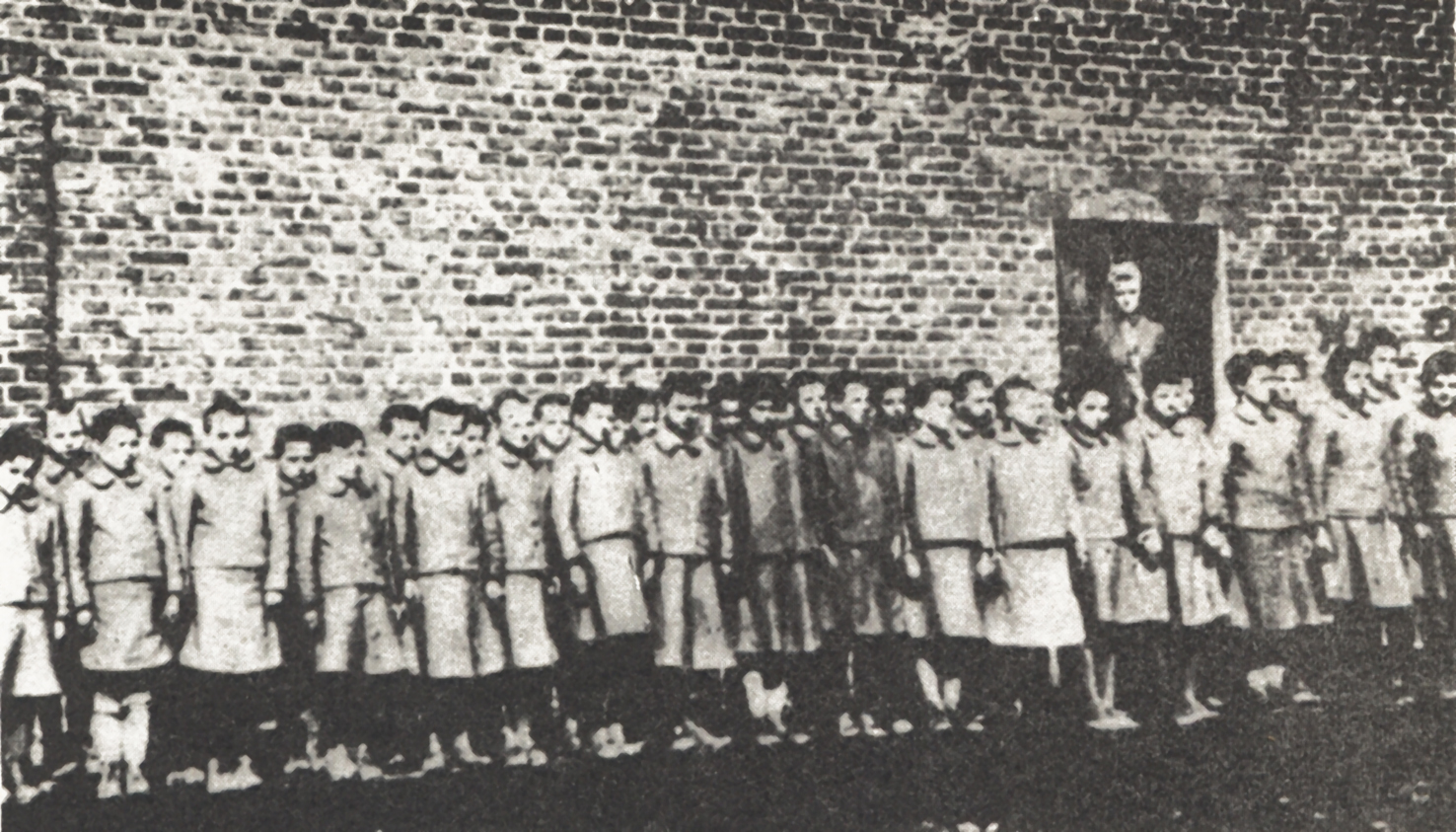
Roll-call for 8-year-old girls at KZ Dzierżązna, a sub-camp of children's concentration camp in Łódź

The girls' camp was a sub-camp of the main camp for Polish children in Łódź called Kinder-KZ Litzmannstadt (full name in German: Polen-Jugendverwahrlager der Sicherheitspolizei in Litzmannstadt), operated from January 1943 till January 1945. The adjacent fields in Dzierżązna were cultivated by Polish children to supply produce for the main concentration camp in the city averaging 1,600 Polish child labourers.

Polish girls were prepared in Dzierżązna for slave labour on German farms in the Reich, under the command of SS Aufseherin Sydomia Bayer (b.1903-hanged 12 November 1945 Poland). She is known to have killed at least one of the little girls, named Urszula Kaczmarek, by flogging her to death in front of other children. The camp and sub-camp were the only complex of its kind established in occupied Poland. Other similar camps existed only in Croatia, administered by the Ustaše.

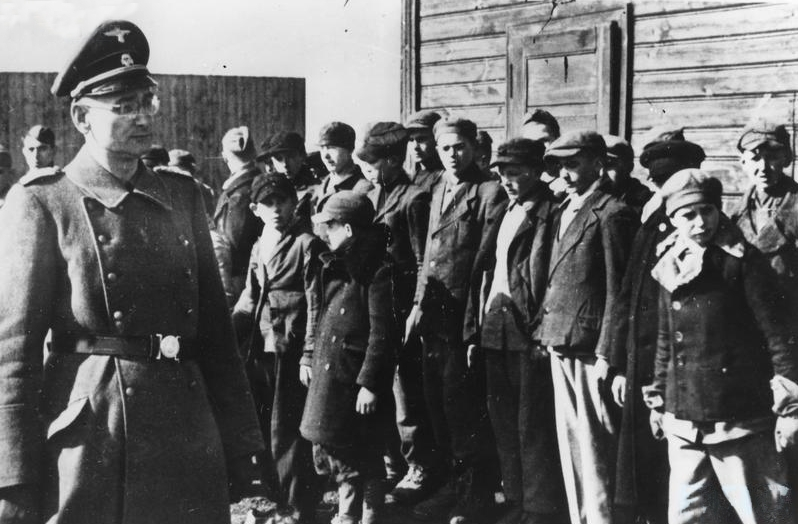
Roll-call for boys at the main children's concentration camp in Łódź to which KZ Dzierżązna belonged as a sub-camp
