= Gmina Ryczywół =

Gmina Ryczywół Ryczywół Commune
- Gmina
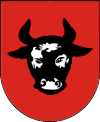
- Coat of arms
- Interactive map of Gmina Ryczywół
- Coordinates (Ryczywół): 52°48′49″N 16°50′7″E
- Country: Poland
- Voivodeship: Greater Poland
- County: Oborniki
- Seat: Ryczywół

Area
  - Total: 154.54 km^{2} (59.67 sq mi)

Population (2006)
  - Total: 7,113
  - Density: 46.03/km^{2} (119.2/sq mi)
- Website: http://www.ryczywol.pl

Gmina Ryczywół is a rural gmina (administrative district) in Oborniki County, Greater Poland Voivodeship, in west-central Poland. Its seat is the village of Ryczywół, which lies approximately 19 kilometres (12 mi) north of Oborniki and 47 km (29 mi) north of the regional capital Poznań.

The gmina covers an area of 154.54 square kilometres (59.7 sq mi), and as of 2006 its total population is 7,113.

== Massacre during Second World War ==
During the German Invasion of Poland in 1939, German minority members from Selbstschutz units mass murdered 21 Poles between 13 and 24 September. In most of the cases the victims had their skulls crashed by hand tools. Among Germans responsible following names have been identified:Erwin Bruno, Alexander Muller, Leonard Fietz, Kurt Munak, Georg Wendlandt, Heinz Noak, Willi Hubner.

== Villages ==
Gmina Ryczywół contains the villages and settlements of Boruchowo, Chlebowo, Chmielewo, Dąbrówka Ludomska, Drzonek, Gorzewko, Gorzewo, Gościejewko, Gościejewo Leśne, Igrzyna, Krężoły, Łaszczewiec, Lipa, Lipa Nowa, Lipa-Bagna, Lipa-Wojciechowo, Łopiszewo, Ludomicko, Ludomki, Ludomy, Ninino, Orłowo, Piłka-Młyn, Piotrowo, Połajewice, Radom, Ryczywół, Skrzetusz, Tłukawy, Trzy Góry, Wiardunki and Zawady.

== Neighbouring gminas ==
Gmina Ryczywół is bordered by the gminas of Budzyń, Czarnków, Oborniki, Połajewo and Rogoźno.
