= Drzonek, Oborniki County =

Drzonek
- Settlement
- Location within Poland
- Coordinates: 52°46′02″N 16°50′54″E
- Country: Poland
- Voivodeship: Greater Poland
- County: Oborniki
- Gmina: Rogoźno

Drzonek [ˈdʐɔnɛk] is a settlement in the administrative district of Gmina Rogoźno, within Oborniki County, Greater Poland Voivodeship, in west-central Poland.
