= Krężoły, Greater Poland Voivodeship =

Krężoły
- Village
- Location within Poland
- Coordinates: 52°48′40″N 16°47′39″E
- Country: Poland
- Voivodeship: Greater Poland
- County: Oborniki
- Gmina: Ryczywół

Krężoły [krɛ̃ˈʐɔwɨ] is a village in the administrative district of Gmina Ryczywół, within Oborniki County, Greater Poland Voivodeship, in west-central Poland.
