= Ryczywół, Greater Poland Voivodeship =

Ryczywół
- Village
- Location within Poland
- Coordinates: 52°48′49″N 16°50′7″E
- Country: Poland
- Voivodeship: Greater Poland
- County: Oborniki
- Gmina: Ryczywół
- Population: 2,080
- Website: https://www.ryczywol.pl

Ryczywół ([rɨˈt͡ʂɨvuu̯]; German: Ritschenwalde) is a village in Oborniki County, Greater Poland Voivodeship, in west-central Poland. It is the seat of the gmina (administrative district) called Gmina Ryczywół.
